Johannes Erwin Eugen Rommel (15 November 1891 – 14 October 1944) was a German field marshal during World War II. Popularly known as the Desert Fox, he served in the Wehrmacht (armed forces) of Nazi Germany, as well as serving in the Reichswehr of the Weimar Republic, and the army of Imperial Germany. Rommel was injured multiple times in both world wars.

Rommel was a highly decorated officer in World War I and was awarded the Pour le Mérite for his actions on the Italian Front. In 1937, he published his classic book on military tactics, Infantry Attacks, drawing on his experiences in that war. 

In World War II, he commanded the 7th Panzer Division during the 1940 invasion of France. His leadership of German and Italian forces in the North African campaign established his reputation as one of the ablest tank commanders of the war, and earned him the nickname der Wüstenfuchs, "the Desert Fox". Among his British adversaries he had a reputation for chivalry, and his phrase "war without hate" has been uncritically used to describe the North African campaign. A number of historians have since rejected the phrase as myth and uncovered numerous examples of German war crimes and abuses towards both enemy soldiers and native populations in Africa during the conflict. Other historians note that there is no clear evidence Rommel was involved or aware of these crimes, with some pointing out that the war in the desert, as fought by Rommel and his opponents, still came as close to a clean fight as there was in World War II. He later commanded the German forces opposing the Allied cross-channel invasion of Normandy in June 1944.

With the Nazis gaining power in Germany, Rommel gradually came to accept the new regime. Historians have given different accounts of the specific period and his motivations. He was a supporter of Adolf Hitler, at least until near the end of the war, if not necessarily sympathetic to the party and the paramilitary forces associated with it. In 1944, Rommel was implicated in the 20 July plot to assassinate Hitler. Because of Rommel's status as a national hero, Hitler wanted to eliminate him quietly instead of having him immediately executed, as many other plotters were. Rommel was given a choice between committing suicide, in return for assurances that his reputation would remain intact and that his family would not be persecuted following his death, or facing a trial that would result in his disgrace and execution; he chose the former and committed suicide using a cyanide pill. Rommel was given a state funeral, and it was announced that he had succumbed to his injuries from the strafing of his staff car in Normandy.

Rommel has become a larger-than-life figure in both Allied and Nazi propaganda, and in postwar popular culture. Numerous authors portray him as an apolitical, brilliant commander and a victim of Nazi Germany, although this assessment is contested by other authors as the Rommel myth. Rommel's reputation for conducting a clean war was used in the interest of the West German rearmament and reconciliation between the former enemies – the United Kingdom and the United States on one side and the new Federal Republic of Germany on the other. Several of Rommel's former subordinates, notably his chief of staff Hans Speidel, played key roles in German rearmament and integration into NATO in the postwar era. The German Army's largest military base, the Field Marshal Rommel Barracks, Augustdorf, is named in his honour. His son Manfred Rommel was the longtime mayor of Stuttgart, Germany and namesake of Stuttgart Airport.

Early life and career 
Rommel was born on 15 November 1891, in Heidenheim,  from Ulm, in the Kingdom of Württemberg, Southern Germany, then part of the German Empire. He was the third of five children to Erwin Rommel Senior (1860–1913) and his wife Helene von Luz, whose father, Karl von Luz, headed the local government council. As a young man, Rommel's father had been an artillery lieutenant. Rommel had one older sister who was an art teacher and his favourite sibling, one older brother named Manfred who died in infancy, and two younger brothers, of whom one became a successful dentist and the other an opera singer.

At age 18 Rommel joined the Württemberg Infantry Regiment No. 124 in Weingarten as a Fähnrich (ensign), in 1910, studying at the Officer Cadet School in Danzig. He graduated in November 1911 and was commissioned as a lieutenant in January 1912 and was assigned to the 124th Infantry in Weingarten. He was posted to Ulm in March 1914 to the 49th Field Artillery Regiment, XIII (Royal Württemberg) Corps, as a battery commander. He returned to the 124th when war was declared. While at Cadet School, Rommel met his future wife, 17-year-old Lucia (Lucie) Maria Mollin (1894–1971), of Italian and Polish descent.

World War I 

During World War I, Rommel fought in France as well as in the Romanian (notably at the Second Battle of the Jiu Valley) and Italian campaigns. He successfully employed the tactics of penetrating enemy lines with heavy covering fire coupled with rapid advances, as well as moving forward rapidly to a flanking position to arrive at the rear of hostile positions, to achieve tactical surprise. His first combat experience was on 22 August 1914 as a platoon commander near Verdun, when – catching a French garrison unprepared – Rommel and three men opened fire on them without ordering the rest of his platoon forward. The armies continued to skirmish in open engagements throughout September, as the static trench warfare typical of the First World War was still in the future. For his actions in September 1914 and January 1915, Rommel was awarded the Iron Cross, Second Class. Rommel was promoted to Oberleutnant (first lieutenant) and transferred to the newly created Royal Wurttemberg Mountain Battalion of the Alpenkorps in September 1915, as a company commander. In November 1916 in Danzig, Rommel and Lucia married.

In August 1917, his unit was involved in the battle for Mount Cosna, a heavily fortified objective on the border between Hungary and Romania, which they took after two weeks of difficult uphill fighting. The Mountain Battalion was next assigned to the Isonzo front, in a mountainous area in Italy. The offensive, known as the Battle of Caporetto, began on 24 October 1917. Rommel's battalion, consisting of three rifle companies and a machine gun unit, was part of an attempt to take enemy positions on three mountains: Kolovrat, Matajur, and Stol. In two and a half days, from 25 to 27 October, Rommel and his 150 men captured 81 guns and 9,000 men (including 150 officers), at a loss of six dead and 30 wounded. Rommel achieved this remarkable success by taking advantage of the terrain to outflank the Italian forces, attacking from unexpected directions or behind enemy lines, and taking the initiative to attack when he had orders to the contrary. In one instance, the Italian forces, taken by surprise and believing that their lines had collapsed, surrendered after a brief firefight. In this battle, Rommel helped pioneer infiltration tactics, a new form of manoeuvre warfare just being adopted by German armies, and later by foreign armies, and described by some as Blitzkrieg without tanks, though he played no role in the early adoption of Blitzkrieg in World War II. Acting as advance guard in the capture of Longarone on 9 November, Rommel again decided to attack with a much smaller force. Convinced that they were surrounded by an entire German division, the 1st Italian Infantry Division – 10,000 men – surrendered to Rommel. For this and his actions at Matajur, he received the order of Pour le Mérite.

In January 1918, Rommel was promoted to Hauptmann (captain) and assigned to a staff position in the 64th Army Corps, where he served for the remainder of the war.

Between the wars 
Rommel remained with the 124th Regiment until October 1920. The regiment was involved in quelling riots and civil disturbances that were occurring throughout Germany at this time. Wherever possible, Rommel avoided the use of force in these confrontations. In 1919, he was briefly sent to Friedrichshafen on Lake Constance, where he restored order by "sheer force of personality" in the 32nd Internal Security Company, which was composed of rebellious and pro-communist sailors. He decided against storming the nearby city of Lindau, which had been taken by revolutionary communists. Instead, Rommel negotiated with the city council and managed to return it to the legitimate government through diplomatic means. This was followed by his defence of Schwäbisch Gmünd, again bloodless. He was then posted to the Ruhr, where a red army was responsible for fomenting unrest. Historian  praises Rommel as a coolheaded and moderate mind, exceptional amid the many takeovers of revolutionary cities by regular and irregular units and the associated massive violence.

According to Reuth, this period gave Rommel the indelible impression that "Everyone in this Republic was fighting each other," along with the direct experience of people who attempted to convert Germany into a socialist republic on Soviet lines. There are similarities with Hitler's experiences: like Rommel, Hitler had known the solidarity of trench warfare and then had participated in the Reichswehr's suppression of the First and Second Bavarian Soviet Republics. The need for national unity thus became a decisive legacy of the first World War. Brighton notes that while both believed in the Stab-in-the-back myth, Rommel was able to succeed using peaceful methods because he saw the problem in empty stomachs rather than in Judeo-Bolshevism – which right-wing soldiers such as Hitler blamed for the chaos in Germany.

On 1 October 1920, Rommel was appointed to a company command with the 13th Infantry Regiment in Stuttgart, a post he held for the next nine years. He was then assigned to an instruction position at the Dresden Infantry School from 1929 to 1933; during this time, in April 1932, he was promoted to major. While at Dresden, he wrote a manual on infantry training, published in 1934. In October 1933, he was promoted to Oberstleutnant (lieutenant colonel) and given his next command, the 3rd Jäger Battalion, 17th Infantry Regiment, stationed at Goslar. Here he first met Hitler, who inspected his troops on 30 September 1934. In September 1935, Rommel was moved to the War Academy in Potsdam as an instructor, serving for the next three years. His book Infanterie greift an (Infantry Attacks), a description of his wartime experiences along with his analysis, was published in 1937. It became a best-seller, which, according to Scheck, later "enormously influenced" many armies of the world; Adolf Hitler was one of many who owned a copy.

Hearing of Rommel's reputation as an outstanding military instructor, in February 1937 Hitler assigned him as the War Ministry liaison officer to the Hitler Youth in charge of military training. Here he clashed with Baldur von Schirach, the Hitler Youth leader, over the training that the boys should receive. Trying to fulfill a mission assigned to him by the Ministry of War, Rommel had twice proposed a plan that would have effectively subordinated Hitler Youth to the army, removing it from NSDAP control. That went against Schirach's express wishes. Schirach appealed directly to Hitler; consequently, Rommel was quietly removed from the project in 1938. He had been promoted to Oberst (colonel), on 1 August 1937, and in 1938, following the Anschluss, he was appointed commandant of the Theresian Military Academy at Wiener Neustadt.

In October 1938, Hitler specially requested that Rommel be seconded to command the Führerbegleitbatallion (his escort battalion). This unit accompanied Hitler whenever he travelled outside of Germany. During this period, Rommel indulged his interest in engineering and mechanics by learning about the inner workings and maintenance of internal combustion engines and heavy machine guns. He memorised logarithm tables in his spare time and enjoyed skiing and other outdoor sports. Ian F. Beckett writes that by 1938, Rommel drifted towards uncritical acceptance of Nazi regime, quoting Rommel's letter to his wife in which he stated "The German Wehrmacht is the sword of the new German world view" as a reaction to speech by Hitler.

During his visit to Switzerland in 1938, Rommel reported that Swiss soldiers who he met showed "remarkable understanding of our Jewish problem". Butler comments that he did share the view (popular in Germany and many European countries during that time) that as a people, the Jews were loyal to themselves rather than the nations which they lived in. Despite this fact, other pieces of evidence show that he considered the Nazi racial ideologies rubbish. Searle comments that Rommel knew the official stand of the regime, but in this case, the phrase was ambiguous and there is no evidence after or before this event that he ever sympathised with the antisemitism of the Nazi movement. Rommel's son Manfred Rommel stated in documentary The Real Rommel, published in 2001 by Channel 4 that his father would "look the other way" when faced with anti-Jewish violence on the streets. According to the documentary, Rommel also requested proof of "Aryan descent" from the Italian boyfriend of his illegitimate daughter Gertrud. According to Remy, during the time Rommel was posted in Goslar, he repeatedly clashed with the SA whose members terrorised the Jews and dissident Goslar citizens. After the Röhm Purge, he mistakenly believed that the worst was over, although restrictions on Jewish businesses were still being imposed and agitation against their community continued. According to Remy, Manfred Rommel recounts that his father knew about and privately disagreed with the government's antisemitism, but by this time, he had not actively campaigned on behalf of the Jews. However, Uri Avnery notes that even when he was a low-ranking officer, he protected the Jews who lived in his district. Manfred Rommel tells the Stuttgarter Nachrichten that their family lived in isolated military lands but knew about the discrimination against the Jews which was occurring on the outside. They could not foresee the enormity of the impending atrocities, about which they only knew much later.

At one point, Rommel wrote to his wife that Hitler had a "magnetic, maybe hypnotic, strength" that had its origin in Hitler's belief that he "was called upon by God" and Hitler sometimes "spoke from the depth of his being [...] like a prophet".

World War II

Poland 1939 

Rommel was promoted to Generalmajor on 23 August 1939 and assigned as commander of the Führerbegleitbatallion, tasked with guarding Hitler and his field headquarters during the invasion of Poland, which began on 1 September. According to Remy, Rommel's private letters at this time show that he did not understand Hitler's true nature and intentions, as he quickly went from predicting a swift peaceful settlement of tensions to approving Hitler's reaction ("bombs will be retaliated with bombs") to the Gleiwitz incident (a false flag operation staged by Hitler and used as a pretext for the invasion). Hitler took a personal interest in the campaign, often moving close to the front in the Führersonderzug (headquarters train). Rommel attended Hitler's daily war briefings and accompanied him everywhere, making use of the opportunity to observe first-hand the use of tanks and other motorised units. On 26 September Rommel returned to Berlin to set up a new headquarters for his unit in the Reich Chancellery. Rommel briefly returned to occupied Warsaw on 5 October in order to prepare for the German victory parade. In a letter to his wife he claimed that the occupation by Nazi Germany was "probably welcomed with relief" by the inhabitants of the ruined city and that they were "rescued".

France 1940

Promotion to armoured division commander 

Following the invasion of Poland, Rommel began lobbying for command of one of Germany's panzer divisions, of which there were then only ten. Rommel's successes in World War I were based on surprise and manoeuvre, two elements for which the new panzer units were ideally suited. Rommel received a promotion to a general's rank from Hitler ahead of more senior officers. Rommel obtained the command he aspired to, despite having been earlier turned down by the army's personnel office, which had offered him command of a mountain division instead. According to Peter Caddick-Adams, he was backed by Hitler, the influential Fourteenth Army commander Wilhelm List (a fellow Württemberger middle-class "military outsider") and likely Heinz Guderian, the commander of XIX Army Corps, as well.

Going against military protocol, this promotion added to Rommel's growing reputation as one of Hitler's favoured commanders, although his later outstanding leadership in France quelled complaints about his self-promotion and political scheming. The 7th Panzer Division had recently been converted to an armoured division consisting of 218 tanks in three battalions (thus, one tank regiment, instead of the two assigned to a standard panzer division), with two rifle regiments, a motorcycle battalion, an engineer battalion, and an anti-tank battalion. Upon taking command on 10 February 1940, Rommel quickly set his unit to practising the manoeuvres they would need in the upcoming campaign.

Invasion of the Netherlands, Belgium and France 

The invasion began on 10 May 1940. By the third day Rommel and the advance elements of his division, together with a detachment of the 5th Panzer Division, had reached the Meuse, where they found the bridges had already been destroyed (Guderian and Georg-Hans Reinhardt reached the river on the same day). Rommel was active in the forward areas, directing the efforts to make a crossing, which were initially unsuccessful because of suppressive fire by the French on the other side of the river. Rommel brought up tanks and flak units to provide counter-fire and had nearby houses set on fire to create a smokescreen. He sent infantry across in rubber boats, appropriated the bridging tackle of the 5th Panzer Division, personally grabbed a light machine gun to fight off a French counterattack supported by tanks, and went into the water himself, encouraging the sappers and helping lash together the pontoons. By 16 May Rommel reached Avesnes, and contravening orders, he pressed on to Cateau. That night, the French II Army Corps was shattered and on 17 May, Rommel's forces took 10,000 prisoners, losing 36 men in the process. He was surprised to find out only his vanguard had followed his tempestuous surge. The High Command and Hitler had been extremely nervous about his disappearance, although they awarded him the Knight's Cross. Rommel's (and Guderian's) successes and the new possibilities offered by the new tank arm were welcomed by a small number of generals, but worried and paralysed the rest.

On 20 May, Rommel reached Arras. General Hermann Hoth received orders that the town should be bypassed and its British garrison thus isolated. He ordered the 5th Panzer Division to move to the west and the 7th Panzer Division to the east, flanked by the SS Division Totenkopf. The following day, the British launched a counterattack in the Battle of Arras. It failed and the British withdrew.

On 24 May, Generaloberst (Colonel General) Gerd von Rundstedt and Generaloberst Günther von Kluge issued a halt order, which Hitler approved. The reason for this decision is still a matter of debate. The halt order was lifted on 26 May. 7th Panzer continued its advance, reaching Lille on 27 May. The Siege of Lille continued until 31 May, when the French garrison of 40,000 men surrendered. Rommel was summoned to Berlin to meet with Hitler. He was the only divisional commander present at the planning session for Fall Rot (Case Red), the second phase of the invasion of France. By this time the Dunkirk evacuation was complete; over 338,000 Allied troops had been evacuated across the Channel, though they had to leave behind all their heavy equipment and vehicles.

Drive for the Channel 

Rommel, resuming his advance on 5 June, drove for the River Seine to secure the bridges near Rouen. Advancing  in two days, the division reached Rouen to find it defended by three French tanks which managed to destroy a number of German tanks before being taken out. The German force, enraged by this resistance, forbade fire brigades access to the burning district of the old Norman capital, and as a result most of the historic quarter was reduced to ashes. According to David Fraser, Rommel instructed the German artillery to bombard the city as a "fire demonstration". According to one witness report the smoke from burning Rouen was intense enough that it reached Paris. Daniel Allen Butler states that the bridges to the city were already destroyed. After the fall of the city, both black civilians and colonial troops were summarily executed on 9 June by unknown German units. The number of black civilians and prisoners killed is estimated at around 100. According to Butler and Showalter, Rouen fell to the 5th Panzer Division, while Rommel advanced from the Seine towards the Channel. On 10 June, Rommel reached the coast near Dieppe, sending Hoth the message "Bin an der Küste" ("Am on the coast"). On 17 June, 7th Panzer was ordered to advance on Cherbourg, where additional British evacuations were under way. The division advanced  in 24 hours, and after two days of shelling, the French garrison surrendered on 19 June. The speed and surprise that it was consistently able to achieve, to the point at which both the enemy and the Oberkommando des Heeres (OKH; German "High Command  of the Army") at times lost track of its whereabouts, earned the 7th Panzers the nickname Gespensterdivision ("ghost division").

After the armistice with the French was signed on 22 June, the division was placed in reserve, being sent first to the Somme and then to Bordeaux to re-equip and prepare for Unternehmen Seelöwe (Operation Sea Lion), the planned invasion of Britain. This invasion was later cancelled, as Germany was not able to acquire the air superiority needed for a successful outcome, while the Kriegsmarine was massively outnumbered by the Royal Navy.

North Africa 1941–1943 

On 6 February 1941, Rommel was appointed commander of the new Afrika Korps (Deutsches Afrika Korps; DAK), consisting of the 5th Light Division (later renamed 21st Panzer Division) and of the 15th Panzer Division. He was promoted to Generalleutnant three days later and flew to Tripoli on 12 February. The DAK had been sent to Libya in Operation Sonnenblume to support Italian troops who had been roundly defeated by British Commonwealth forces in Operation Compass.  His efforts in the Western Desert Campaign earned Rommel the nickname the "Desert Fox" from journalists on both sides of the war. Allied troops in Africa were commanded by General Archibald Wavell, Commander-in-Chief, Middle East Command.

First Axis offensive 
Rommel and his troops were technically subordinate to Italian commander-in-chief General Italo Gariboldi. Disagreeing with the orders of the Oberkommando der Wehrmacht (OKW, German armed forces high command) to assume a defensive posture along the front line at Sirte, Rommel resorted to subterfuge and insubordination to take the war to the British. According to Remy, the General Staff tried to slow him down but Hitler encouraged him to advance—an expression of the conflict that had existed between Hitler and the army leadership since the invasion of Poland. He decided to launch a limited offensive on 24 March with the 5th Light Division, supported by two Italian divisions. This thrust was not anticipated by the British, who had Ultra intelligence showing that Rommel had orders to remain on the defensive until at least May, when the 15th Panzer Division were due to arrive.

The British Western Desert Force had meanwhile been weakened by the transfer in mid-February of three divisions for the Battle of Greece. They fell back to Mersa El Brega and started constructing defensive works. After a day of fierce fighting on 31 March, the Germans captured Mersa El Brega. Splitting his force into three groups, Rommel resumed the advance on 3 April. Benghazi fell that night as the British pulled out of the city. Gariboldi, who had ordered Rommel to stay in Mersa El Brega, was furious. Rommel was equally forceful in his response, telling Gariboldi, "One cannot permit unique opportunities to slip by for the sake of trifles." A signal arrived from General Franz Halder reminding Rommel that he was to halt in Mersa El Brega. Knowing Gariboldi could not speak German, Rommel told him the message gave him complete freedom of action. Gariboldi backed down. Throughout the campaign, fuel supply was problematic, as no petrol was available locally; it had to be brought from Europe by tanker and then carried by road to where it was needed. Food and fresh water were also in short supply, and it was difficult to move tanks and other equipment off-road through the sand. Cyrenaica was captured by 8 April, except for the port city of Tobruk, which was besieged on 11 April.

Siege of Tobruk 

The siege of Tobruk was not technically a siege, as the defenders were still able to move supplies and reinforcements into the city via the port. Rommel knew that by capturing the port he could greatly reduce the length of his supply lines and increase his overall port capacity, which was insufficient even for day-to-day operations and only half that needed for offensive operations. The city, which had been heavily fortified by the Italians during their 30-year occupation, was garrisoned by 36,000 Commonwealth troops, commanded by Australian Lieutenant General Leslie Morshead. Hoping to catch the defenders off-guard, Rommel launched a failed attack on 14 April.

Rommel requested reinforcements, but the OKW, then completing preparations for Operation Barbarossa, refused. General Friedrich Paulus, head of the Operations Branch of the OKH, arrived on 25 April to review the situation. He was present for a second failed attack on the city on 30 April. On 4 May Paulus ordered that no further attempts should be made to take Tobruk via a direct assault. Following a failed counter-attack in Operation Brevity in May, Wavell launched Operation Battleaxe on 15 June; this attack was also defeated. The defeat resulted in Churchill replacing Wavell with General Claude Auchinleck as theatre commander.

In August, Rommel was appointed commander of the newly created Panzer Army Africa, with Fritz Bayerlein as his chief of staff. The Afrika Korps, comprising the 15th Panzer Division and the 5th Light Division, now reinforced and redesignated 21st Panzer Division, was put under command of Generalleutnant Ludwig Crüwell. In addition to the Afrika Korps, Rommel's Panzer Group had the 90th Light Division and four Italian divisions, three infantry divisions investing Tobruk, and one holding Bardia. The two Italian armoured divisions, formed into the Italian XX Motorized Corps under the command of General Gastone Gambara, were under Italian control. Two months later Hitler decided he must have German officers in better control of the Mediterranean theatre, and appointed Field Marshal Albert Kesselring as Commander in Chief, South. Kesselring was ordered to get control of the air and sea between Africa and Italy.

Following his success in Battleaxe, Rommel returned his attention to the capture of Tobruk. He made preparations for a new offensive, to be launched between 15 and 20 November. Meanwhile, Auchinleck reorganised Allied forces and strengthened them to two corps, XXX and XIII, which formed the British Eighth Army. It was placed under the command of Alan Cunningham.  Auchinleck launched Operation Crusader, a major offensive to relieve Tobruk, on 18 November 1941. Rommel reluctantly decided on 20 November to call off his planned attack on Tobruk.

In four days of heavy fighting, the Eighth Army lost 530 tanks and Rommel only 100. Wanting to exploit the British halt and their apparent disorganisation, on 24 November Rommel counterattacked near the Egyptian border in an operation that became known as the "dash to the wire". Cunningham asked Auchinleck for permission to withdraw into Egypt, but Auchinleck refused, and soon replaced Cunningham as commander of Eighth Army with Major General Neil Ritchie. The German counterattack stalled as it outran its supplies and met stiffening resistance, and was criticised by the German High Command and some of Rommel's staff officers.

While Rommel drove into Egypt, the remaining Commonwealth forces east of Tobruk threatened the weak Axis lines there. Unable to reach Rommel for several days, Rommel's Chief of Staff, Siegfried Westphal, ordered the 21st Panzer Division withdrawn to support the siege of Tobruk. On 27 November the British attack on Tobruk linked up with the defenders, and Rommel, having suffered losses that could not easily be replaced, had to concentrate on regrouping the divisions that had attacked into Egypt. By 7 December Rommel fell back to a defensive line at Gazala, just west of Tobruk, all the while under heavy attack from the Desert Air Force. The Allies kept up the pressure, and Rommel was forced to retreat all the way back to the starting positions he had held in March, reaching El Agheila in December 1941. The British had retaken almost all of Cyrenaica, but Rommel's retreat dramatically shortened his supply lines.

Battle of Gazala and capture of Tobruk 

On 5 January 1942 the Afrika Korps received 55 tanks and new supplies and Rommel started planning a counterattack, which he launched on 21 January. Caught by surprise, the Allies lost over 110 tanks and other heavy equipment. The Axis forces retook Benghazi on 29 January and Timimi on 3 February, with the Allies pulling back to a defensive line just before the Tobruk area south of the coastal town of Gazala. Between December 1941 and June 1942, Rommel had excellent information about the disposition and intentions of the Commonwealth forces. Bonner Fellers, the US diplomat in Egypt, was sending detailed reports to the US State Department using a compromised code.

Following Kesselring's successes in creating local air superiority around the British naval and air bases at Malta in April 1942, an increased flow of supplies reached the Axis forces in Africa. With his forces strengthened, Rommel contemplated a major offensive operation for the end of May. He knew the British were planning offensive operations as well, and he hoped to pre-empt them. Early in the afternoon of 26 May 1942, Rommel attacked first and the Battle of Gazala commenced. Under the cover of darkness, the bulk of Rommel's motorised and armoured forces drove south to skirt the left flank of the British, coming up behind them and attacking to the north the following morning.

On 30 May Rommel resumed the offensive, and on 1 June, Rommel accepted the surrender of some 3,000 Commonwealth soldiers. On 6 June, Rommel's forces assaulted the Free French strongpoint in the Battle of Bir Hakeim, but the defenders continued to thwart the attack until finally evacuating on 10 June. Rommel then shifted his attack north; threatened with being completely cut off, the British began a retreat eastward toward Egypt on 14 June, the so-called "Gazala Gallop".

The assault on Tobruk proper began at dawn on 20 June, and the British surrendered at dawn the following day. Rommel's forces captured 32,000 Commonwealth troops, the port, and huge quantities of supplies. Only at the fall of Singapore, earlier that year, had more British Commonwealth troops been captured at one time. On 22 June, Hitler promoted Rommel to Generalfeldmarschall for this victory. Following his success at Gazala and Tobruk, Rommel wanted to seize the moment and not allow 8th Army a chance to regroup. He strongly argued that the Panzerarmee should advance into Egypt and drive on to Alexandria and the Suez Canal, as this would place almost all the Mediterranean coastline in Axis hands and, according to Rommel, potentially lead to the capture from the south of the oil fields in the Caucasus and Middle East.

Rommel's success at Tobruk worked against him, as Hitler no longer felt it was necessary to proceed with Operation Herkules, the proposed attack on Malta. Auchinleck relieved Ritchie of command of the Eighth Army on 25 June, and temporarily took command himself. Rommel knew that delay would only benefit the British, who continued to receive supplies at a faster rate than Rommel could hope to achieve. He pressed an attack on the heavily fortified town of Mersa Matruh, which Auchinleck had designated as the fall-back position, surrounding it on 28 June. The fortress fell to the Germans on 29 June. In addition to stockpiles of fuel and other supplies, the British abandoned hundreds of tanks and trucks. Those that were functional were put into service by the Panzerwaffe.

El Alamein

First Battle of El Alamein 

Rommel continued his pursuit of the Eighth Army, which had fallen back to heavily prepared defensive positions at El Alamein. This region is a natural choke point, where the Qattara Depression creates a relatively short line to defend that could not be outflanked to the south because of the steep escarpment. During this time Germans prepared numerous propaganda postcards and leaflets for Egyptian and Syrian population urging them to "chase English out of the cities", warning them about "Jewish peril" and with one leaflet printed in 296,000 copies and aimed at Syria stating among others

 

On 1 July the First Battle of El Alamein began. Rommel had around 100 available tanks. The Allies were able to achieve local air superiority, with heavy bombers attacking the 15th and 21st Panzers, who had also been delayed by a sandstorm. The 90th Light Division veered off course and were pinned down by South African artillery fire. Rommel continued to attempt to advance for two more days, but repeated sorties by the Desert Air Force meant he could make no progress. On 3 July, he wrote in his diary that his strength had "faded away". Attacks by 21st Panzer on 13 and 14 July were repulsed, and an Australian attack on 16–17 July was held off with difficulty. Throughout the first half of July, Auchinleck concentrated attacks on the Italian 60th Infantry Division Sabratha at Tel el Eisa. The ridge was captured by the 26th Australian Brigade on 16 July. Both sides suffered similar losses throughout the month, but the Axis supply situation remained less favourable. Rommel realised that the tide was turning. A break in the action took place at the end of July as both sides rested and regrouped.

Preparing for a renewed drive, the British replaced Auchinleck with General Harold Alexander on 8 August. Bernard Montgomery was made the new commander of Eighth Army that same day. The Eighth Army had initially been assigned to General William Gott, but he was killed when his plane was shot down on 7 August. Rommel knew that a British convoy carrying over 100,000 tons of supplies was due to arrive in September. He decided to launch an attack at the end of August with the 15th and 21st Panzer Division, 90th Light Division, and the Italian XX Motorized Corps in a drive through the southern flank of the El Alamein lines.

Battle of Alam El Halfa 

The Battle of Alam el Halfa was launched on 30 August. The terrain left Rommel with no choice but to follow a similar tactic as he had at previous battles: the bulk of the forces attempted to sweep around from the south while secondary attacks were launched on the remainder of the front. It took much longer than anticipated to get through the minefields in the southern sector, and the tanks got bogged down in unexpected patches of quicksand (Montgomery had arranged for Rommel to acquire a falsified map of the terrain). Under heavy fire from British artillery and aircraft, and in the face of well prepared positions that Rommel could not hope to outflank for lack of fuel, the attack stalled. By 2 September, Rommel realised the battle was unwinnable, and decided to withdraw.

On the night of 3 September the 2nd New Zealand Division and 7th Armoured Division positioned to the north engaged in an assault, but they were repelled in a fierce rearguard action by the 90th Light Division. Montgomery called off further action to preserve his strength and allow for further desert training for his forces. In the attack Rommel had suffered 2,940 casualties and lost 50 tanks, a similar number of guns, and 400 lorries, vital for supplies and movement. The British losses, except tank losses of 68, were much less, further adding to the numerical inferiority of Panzer Army Africa. The Desert Air Force inflicted the highest proportions of damage on Rommel's forces. He now realised the war in Africa could not be won. Physically exhausted and suffering from a liver infection and low blood pressure, Rommel flew home to Germany to recover his health. General Georg Stumme was left in command in Rommel's absence.

Second Battle of El Alamein 

Improved decoding by British intelligence (see Ultra) meant that the Allies had advance knowledge of virtually every Mediterranean convoy, and only 30 per cent of shipments were getting through. In addition, Mussolini diverted supplies intended for the front to his garrison at Tripoli and refused to release any additional troops to Rommel. The increasing Allied air superiority and lack of fuel meant Rommel was forced to take a more defensive posture than he would have liked for the second Battle of El Alamein. This, Rommel hoped, would allow his infantry to hold the line at any point until motorised and armoured units in reserve could move up and counterattack any Allied breaches. The British offensive began on 23 October. Stumme, in command in Rommel's absence, died of an apparent heart attack while examining the front on 24 October, and Rommel was ordered to return from his medical leave, arriving on the 25th. Montgomery's intention was to clear a narrow path through the minefield at the northern part of the defences, at the area called Kidney Ridge, with a feint to the south. By the end of 25 October, the 15th Panzer, the defenders in this sector, had only 31 serviceable tanks remaining of their initial force of 119. Rommel brought the 21st Panzer and Ariete Divisions north on 26 October, to bolster the sector. On 28 October, Montgomery shifted his focus to the coast, ordering his 1st and 10th Armoured Divisions to attempt to swing around and cut off Rommel's line of retreat. Meanwhile, Rommel concentrated his attack on the Allied salient at Kidney Ridge, inflicting heavy losses. However, Rommel had only 150 operational tanks remaining, and Montgomery had 800, many of them Shermans.

Montgomery, seeing his armoured brigades losing tanks at an alarming rate, stopped major attacks until the early hours of 2 November, when he opened Operation Supercharge, with a massive artillery barrage. Due to heavy losses in tanks, towards the end of the day, Rommel ordered his forces to disengage and begin to withdraw. At midnight, he informed the OKW of his decision, and received a reply directly from Hitler the following afternoon: he ordered Rommel and his troops to hold their position to the last man. Rommel, who believed that the lives of his soldiers should never be squandered needlessly, was stunned. Rommel initially complied with the order, but after discussions with Kesselring and others, he issued orders for a retreat on 4 November. The delay proved costly in terms of his ability to get his forces out of Egypt. He later said the decision to delay was what he most regretted from his time in Africa. Meanwhile, the British 1st and 7th Armoured Division had broken through the German defences and were preparing to swing north and surround the Axis forces. On the evening of the 4th, Rommel finally received word from Hitler authorising the withdrawal.

End of Africa campaign 
As Rommel attempted to withdraw his forces before the British could cut off his retreat, he fought a series of delaying actions. Heavy rains slowed movements and grounded the Desert Air Force, which aided the withdrawal, yet Rommel's troops were under pressure from the pursuing Eighth Army and had to abandon the trucks of the Italian forces, leaving them behind. Rommel continued to retreat west, aiming for 'Gabes gap' in Tunisia. Kesselring strongly criticised Rommel's decision to retreat all the way to Tunisia, as each airfield the Germans abandoned extended the range of the Allied bombers and fighters. Rommel defended his decision, pointing out that if he tried to assume a defensive position the Allies would destroy his forces and take the airfields anyway; the retreat saved the lives of his remaining men and shortened his supply lines. By now, Rommel's remaining forces fought in reduced strength combat groups, whereas the Allied forces had great numerical superiority and control of the air. Upon his arrival in Tunisia, Rommel noted with some bitterness the reinforcements, including the 10th Panzer Division, arriving in Tunisia following the Allied invasion of Morocco.

Having reached Tunisia, Rommel launched an attack against the U.S. II Corps which was threatening to cut his lines of supply north to Tunis. Rommel inflicted a sharp defeat on the American forces at the Kasserine Pass in February, his last battlefield victory of the war, and his first engagement against the United States Army.

Rommel immediately turned back against the British forces, occupying the Mareth Line (old French defences on the Libyan border). While Rommel was at Kasserine at the end of January 1943, the Italian General Giovanni Messe was appointed commander of Panzer Army Africa, renamed the Italo-German Panzer Army in recognition of the fact that it consisted of one German and three Italian corps. Though Messe replaced Rommel, he diplomatically deferred to him, and the two coexisted in what was theoretically the same command. On 23 February Army Group Afrika was created with Rommel in command. It included the Italo-German Panzer Army under Messe (renamed 1st Italian Army) and the German 5th Panzer Army in the north of Tunisia under General Hans-Jürgen von Arnim.

The last Rommel offensive in North Africa was on 6 March 1943, when he attacked Eighth Army at the Battle of Medenine. The attack was made with 10th, 15th, and 21st Panzer Divisions. Alerted by Ultra intercepts, Montgomery deployed large numbers of anti-tank guns in the path of the offensive. After losing 52 tanks, Rommel called off the assault. On 9 March he returned to Germany. Command was handed over to General Hans-Jürgen von Arnim. Rommel never returned to Africa. The fighting there continued on for another two months, until 13 May 1943, when Messe surrendered the army group to the Allies.

Italy 1943 
On 23 July 1943, Rommel was moved to Greece as commander of Army Group E to counter a possible British invasion. He arrived in Greece on 25 July but was recalled to Berlin the same day following Mussolini's dismissal from office. This caused the German High Command to review the defensive integrity of the Mediterranean and it was decided that Rommel should be posted to Italy as commander of the newly formed Army Group B. On 16 August 1943, Rommel's headquarters moved to Lake Garda in northern Italy and he formally assumed command of the group, consisting of the 44th Infantry Division, the 26th Panzer Division and the 1st SS Panzer Division Leibstandarte SS Adolf Hitler. When Italy announced its armistice with the Allies on 8 September, Rommel's group took part in Operation Achse, disarming the Italian forces.

Hitler met with Rommel and Kesselring to discuss future operations in Italy on 30 September 1943. Rommel insisted on a defensive line north of Rome, while Kesselring was more optimistic and advocated holding a line south of Rome. Hitler preferred Kesselring's recommendation, and therefore revoked his previous decision for the subordination of Kesselring's forces to Rommel's army group. On 19 October, Hitler decided that Kesselring would be the overall commander of the forces in Italy, sidelining Rommel.

Rommel had wrongly predicted that the collapse of the German line in Italy would be fast. On 21 November, Hitler gave Kesselring overall command of the Italian theatre, moving Rommel and Army Group B to Normandy in France with responsibility for defending the French coast against the long anticipated Allied invasion.

Atlantic Wall 1944 

On 4 November 1943, Rommel became General Inspector of the Western Defences. He was given a staff that befitted an army group commander, and the powers to travel, examine and make suggestions on how to improve the defences. Hitler, who was having a disagreement with him over military matters, intended to use Rommel as a psychological trump card.

There was broad disagreement in the German High Command as to how best to meet the expected allied invasion of Northern France. The Commander-in-Chief West, Gerd von Rundstedt, believed there was no way to stop the invasion near the beaches because of the Allied navies' firepower, as had been experienced at Salerno. He argued that the German armour should be held in reserve well inland near Paris, where they could be used to counter-attack in force in a more traditional military doctrine. The allies could be allowed to extend themselves deep into France, where a battle for control would be fought, allowing the Germans to envelop the allied forces in a pincer movement, cutting off their avenue of retreat. He feared the piecemeal commitment of their armoured forces would cause them to become caught in a battle of attrition which they could not hope to win.

The notion of holding the armour inland to use as a mobile reserve force from which they could mount a powerful counterattack applied the classic use of armoured formations as seen in France in 1940. These tactics were still effective on the Eastern Front, where control of the air was important but did not dominate the action. Rommel's own experiences at the end of the North African campaign revealed to him that the Germans would not be allowed to preserve their armour from air attack for this type of massed assault. Rommel believed their only opportunity would be to oppose the landings directly at the beaches, and to counterattack there before the invaders could become well established. Though there had been some defensive positions established and gun emplacements made, the Atlantic Wall was a token defensive line. Rundstedt had confided to Rommel that it was for propaganda purposes only.

Upon arriving in Northern France Rommel was dismayed by the lack of completed works. According to Ruge, Rommel was in a staff position and could not issue orders, but he took every effort to explain his plan to commanders down to the platoon level, who took up his words eagerly, but "more or less open" opposition from the above slowed down the process. Rundstedt intervened and supported Rommel's request for being made a commander. It was granted on 15 January 1944.

He and his staff set out to improve the fortifications along the Atlantic Wall with great energy and engineering skill. This was a compromise: Rommel now commanded the 7th and 15th armies; he also had authority over a 20-kilometer-wide strip of coastal land between Zuiderzee and the mouth of the Loire. The chain of command was convoluted: the air force and navy had their own chiefs, as did the South and Southwest France and the Panzer group; Rommel also needed Hitler's permissions to use the tank divisions. Rommel had millions of mines laid and thousands of tank traps and obstacles set up on the beaches and throughout the countryside, including in fields suitable for glider aircraft landings, the so-called Rommel's asparagus (the Allies would later counter these with Hobart's Funnies). In April 1944, Rommel promised Hitler that the preparations would be complete by 1 May, a promise he failed to deliver. By the time of the Allied invasion, the preparations were far from finished. The quality of some of the troops manning them was poor and many bunkers lacked sufficient stocks of ammunition.

Rundstedt expected the Allies to invade in the Pas-de-Calais because it was the shortest crossing point from Britain, its port facilities were essential to supplying a large invasion force, and the distance from Calais to Germany was relatively short. Rommel and Hitler's views on the matter is a matter of debate between authors, with both seeming to change their positions.

Hitler vacillated between the two strategies. In late April, he ordered the I SS Panzer Corps placed near Paris, far enough inland to be useless to Rommel, but not far enough for Rundstedt. Rommel moved those armoured formations under his command as far forward as possible, ordering General Erich Marcks, commanding the 84th Corps defending the Normandy section, to move his reserves into the frontline. Rundstedt was willing to delegate a majority of the responsibilities to Rommel (the central reserve was Rundstedt's idea but he did not oppose some form of coastal defence), Rommel's strategy of an armour-supported coastal defence line was opposed by some officers, most notably Leo Geyr von Schweppenburg, who was supported by Guderian. Hitler compromised and gave Rommel three divisions (the 2nd, the 21st and the 116th Panzer), let Rundstedt retain four and turned the other three to Army Group G, pleasing no one.

The Allies staged elaborate deceptions for D-Day (see Operation Fortitude), giving the impression that the landings would be at Calais. Although Hitler himself expected a Normandy invasion for a while, Rommel and most Army commanders in France believed there would be two invasions, with the main invasion coming at the Pas-de-Calais. Rommel drove defensive preparations all along the coast of Northern France, particularly concentrating fortification building in the River Somme estuary. By D-Day on 6 June 1944 nearly all the German staff officers, including Hitler's staff, believed that Pas-de-Calais was going to be the main invasion site, and continued to believe so even after the landings in Normandy had occurred.

The 5 June storm in the channel seemed to make a landing very unlikely, and a number of the senior officers left their units for training exercises and various other efforts. On 4 June the chief meteorologist of the 3 Air Fleet reported that weather in the channel was so poor there could be no landing attempted for two weeks. On 5 June, Rommel left France and on 6 June, he was at home celebrating his wife's 50th  birthday. He was recalled and returned to his headquarters at 10pm. Meanwhile, earlier in the day, Rundstedt had requested the reserves be transferred to his command. At 10am Keitel advised that Hitler declined to release the reserves but that Rundstedt could move the 12th SS Panzer Division Hitlerjugend closer to the coast, with the Panzer-Lehr-Division placed on standby. Later in the day, Rundstedt received authorisation to move additional units in preparation for a counterattack, which Rundstedt decided to launch on 7 June. Upon arrival, Rommel concurred with the plan. By nightfall, Rundstedt, Rommel and Speidel continued to believe that the Normandy landing might have been a diversionary attack, as the Allied deception measures still pointed towards Calais. The 7 June counterattack did not take place because Allied air bombardments prevented the 12th SS's timely arrival. All this made the German command structure in France in disarray during the opening hours of the D-Day invasion.

The Allies secured five beachheads by nightfall of 6 June, landing 155,000 troops. The Allies pushed ashore and expanded their beachhead despite strong German resistance. Rommel believed that if his armies pulled out of range of Allied naval fire, it would give them a chance to regroup and re-engage them later with a better chance of success. While he managed to convince Rundstedt, they still needed to win over Hitler. At a meeting with Hitler at his Wolfsschlucht II headquarters in Margival in northern France on 17 June, Rommel warned Hitler about the inevitable collapse in the German defences, but was rebuffed and told to focus on military operations.

By mid-July the German position was crumbling. On 17 July 1944, as Rommel was returning from visiting the headquarters of the I SS Panzer Corps, a fighter plane piloted by either Charley Fox of 412 Squadron RCAF, Jacques Remlinger of No. 602 Squadron RAF, or Johannes Jacobus le Roux of No. 602 Squadron RAF strafed his staff car near Sainte-Foy-de-Montgommery. The driver sped up and attempted to get off the main roadway, but a 20 mm round shattered his left arm, causing the vehicle to veer off the road and crash into trees. Rommel was thrown from the car, suffering injuries to the left side of his face from glass shards and three fractures to his skull. He was hospitalised with major head injuries (assumed to be almost certainly fatal).

Plot against Hitler 

The role that Rommel played in the military's resistance against Hitler or the 20 July plot is difficult to ascertain, as most of the leaders who were directly involved did not survive and limited documentation on the conspirators' plans and preparations exists. One piece of evidence that points to the possibility that Rommel came to support the assassination plan was General Eberbach's confession to his son (eavesdropped on by British agencies) while in British captivity which stated that Rommel explicitly said to him that Hitler and his close associates had to be killed because this would be the only way out for Germany. This conversation occurred about a month before Rommel was coerced into committing suicide. 

Other notable evidence includes the papers of Rudolf Hartmann (who survived the later purge) and Carl-Heinrich von Stülpnagel, who were among the leaders of the military resistance (alongside Rommel's chief of staff General Hans Speidel, Colonel Karl-Richard Koßmann, Colonel Eberhard Finckh and Lieutenant Colonel Caesar von Hofacker). These papers, accidentally discovered by historian Christian Schweizer in 2018 while doing research on Rudolf Hartmann, include Hartmann's eyewitness account of a conversation between Rommel and Stülpnagel in May 1944, as well as photos of the mid-May 1944 meeting between the inner circle of the resistance and Rommel at Koßmann's house. According to Hartmann, by the end of May, in another meeting at Hartmann's quarters in Mareil–Marly, Rommel showed "decisive determination" and clear approval of the inner circle's plan. In a post-war account by Karl Strölin, three of Rommel's friends—the Oberbürgermeister of Stuttgart, Strölin (who had served with Rommel in the First World War), Alexander von Falkenhausen and Stülpnagel—began efforts to bring Rommel into the anti-Hitler conspiracy in early 1944. According to Strölin, sometime in February, Rommel agreed to lend his support to the resistance. 

On 15 April 1944, Rommel's new chief of staff, Hans Speidel, arrived in Normandy and reintroduced Rommel to Stülpnagel. Speidel had previously been connected to Carl Goerdeler, the civilian leader of the resistance, but not to the plotters led by Claus von Stauffenberg, and came to Stauffenberg's attention only upon his appointment to Rommel's headquarters. The conspirators felt they needed the support of a field marshal on active duty. Erwin von Witzleben, who would have become commander-in-chief of the Wehrmacht had the plot succeeded, was a field marshal, but had been inactive since 1942. The conspirators gave instructions to Speidel to bring Rommel into their circle. Speidel met with former foreign minister Konstantin von Neurath and Strölin on 27 May in Germany, ostensibly at Rommel's request, although the latter was not present. Neurath and Strölin suggested opening immediate surrender negotiations in the West, and, according to Speidel, Rommel agreed to further discussions and preparations.  Around the same timeframe, the plotters in Berlin were not aware that Rommel had allegedly decided to take part in the conspiracy. On 16 May, they informed Allen Dulles, through whom they hoped to negotiate with the Western Allies, that Rommel could not be counted on for support.

At least initially, Rommel opposed assassinating Hitler. According to some authors, he gradually changed his attitude. After the war, his widow—among others—maintained that Rommel believed an assassination attempt would spark civil war in Germany and Austria, and Hitler would have become a martyr for a lasting cause. Instead, Rommel reportedly suggested that Hitler be arrested and brought to trial for his crimes; he did not attempt to implement this plan when Hitler visited Margival, France, on 17 June. The arrest plan would have been highly improbable as Hitler's security was extremely tight. Rommel would have known this, having commanded Hitler's army protection detail in 1939. He was in favour of peace negotiations and repeatedly urged Hitler to negotiate with the Allies which is dubbed by some as "hopelessly naive" considering no one would trust Hitler.  "As naive as it was idealistic, the attitude he showed to the man he had sworn loyalty". 

According to Reuth, the reason Lucie Rommel did not want her husband to be associated with any conspiracy was that even after the war, the German population neither grasped nor wanted to comprehend the reality of the genocide, thus conspirators were still treated as traitors and outcasts. On the other hand, the resistance depended on the reputation of Rommel to win over the population. Some officers who had worked with Rommel also recognised the relationship between Rommel and the resistance: Westphal said that Rommel did not want any more senseless sacrifices. Butler, using Ruge's recollections, reports that when told by Hitler himself that "no one will make peace with me", Rommel told Hitler that if he was the obstacle for peace, he should resign or kill himself, but Hitler insisted on fanatical defence. 

Reuth, based on Jodl's testimony, reports that Rommel forcefully presented the situation and asked for political solutions from Hitler, who rebuffed that Rommel should leave politics to him. Brighton comments that Rommel seemed devoted, even though he did not have much faith in Hitler anymore considering he kept informing Hitler in person and by letter about his changing beliefs despite facing a military dilemma as well as a personal struggle. Lieb remarks that Rommel's attitude in describing the situation honestly and requiring political solutions was almost without precedent and contrary to the attitude of many other generals. Remy comments that Rommel put himself and his family (which he had briefly considered evacuating to France, but refrained from doing so) at risk for the resistance out of a combination of his concern for the fate of Germany, his indignation at atrocities and the influence of people around him.

On 15 July, Rommel wrote a letter to Hitler giving him a "last chance" to end the hostilities with the Western Allies, urging Hitler to "draw the proper conclusions without delay". What Rommel did not know was that the letter took two weeks to reach Hitler because of Kluge's precautions. Various authors report that many German generals in Normandy, including some SS officers like Hausser, Bittrich, Dietrich (a hard-core Nazi and Hitler's long-time supporter) and Rommel's former opponent Geyr von Schweppenburg, pledged support to him even against Hitler's orders, while Kluge supported him with much hesitation. Rundstedt encouraged Rommel to carry out his plans but refused to do anything himself, remarking that it had to be a man who was still young and loved by the people, while Erich von Manstein was also approached by Rommel but categorically refused, although he did not report them to Hitler either. Peter Hoffmann reports that he also attracted into his orbit officials who had previously refused to support the conspiracy, like Julius Dorpmüller and Karl Kaufmann (according to Russell A. Hart, reliable details of the conversations are now lost, although they certainly met).

On 17 July 1944, Rommel was incapacitated by an Allied air attack, which many authors describe as a fateful event that drastically altered the outcome of the bomb plot. Writer Ernst Jünger commented: "The blow that felled Rommel ... robbed the plan of the shoulders that were to be entrusted the double weight of war and civil war - the only man who had enough naivety to counter the simple terror that those he was about to go against possessed." After the failed bomb attack of 20 July, many conspirators were arrested and the dragnet expanded to thousands. Rommel was first implicated when Stülpnagel, after his suicide attempt, repeatedly muttered "Rommel" in delirium. Under torture, Hofacker named Rommel as one of the participants. Additionally, Goerdeler had written down Rommel's name on a list as potential Reich President (according to Stroelin. They had not managed to announce this intention to Rommel yet and he probably never heard of it until the end of his life).

On 27 September, Martin Bormann submitted to Hitler a memorandum which claimed that "the late General Stülpnagel, Colonel Hofacker, Kluge's nephew who has been executed, Lieutenant Colonel Rathgens, and several ... living defendants have testified that Field Marshal Rommel was perfectly in the picture about the assassination plan and has promised to be at the disposal of the New Government." Gestapo agents were sent to Rommel's house in Ulm and placed him under surveillance. Historian Peter Lieb considers the memorandum, as well as Eberbach's conversation and the testimonies of surviving resistance members (including Hartmann), to be the three key sources that indicate Rommel's support of the assassination plan. He further notes that while Speidel had an interest in promoting his own post-war career, his testimonies should not be dismissed, considering his bravery as an early resistance figure. Remy writes that even more important than Rommel's attitude to the assassination is the fact Rommel had his own plan to end the war. He began to contemplate this plan some months after El Alamein and carried it out with a lonely decision and conviction, and in the end, had managed to bring military leaders in the West to his side.

Death 

Rommel's case was turned over to the "Court of Military Honour"—a drumhead court-martial convened to decide the fate of officers involved in the conspiracy. The court included Generalfeldmarschall Wilhelm Keitel, Generalfeldmarschall Gerd von Rundstedt, Generaloberst Heinz Guderian, General der Infanterie Walther Schroth and Generalleutnant Karl-Wilhelm Specht, with General der Infanterie Karl Kriebel and Generalleutnant Heinrich Kirchheim (whom Rommel had fired after Tobruk in 1941) as deputy members and Generalmajor Ernst Maisel as protocol officer. The Court acquired information from Speidel, Hofacker and others that implicated Rommel, with Keitel and Ernst Kaltenbrunner assuming that he had taken part in the subversion. Keitel and Guderian then made the decision that favoured Speidel's case and at the same time shifted the blame to Rommel. By normal procedure, this would lead to Rommel's being brought to Roland Freisler's People's Court, a kangaroo court that always decided in favour of the prosecution. However, Hitler knew that having Rommel branded and executed as a traitor would severely damage morale on the home front. He thus decided to offer Rommel the chance to take his own life.

Two generals from Hitler's headquarters, Wilhelm Burgdorf and Ernst Maisel, visited Rommel at his home on 14 October 1944. Burgdorf informed him of the charges against him and offered him three options: (a.) he could choose to defend himself personally in front of Hitler in Berlin, or if he refused to do so (which would be taken as an admission of guilt); (b.) he could face the People's Court (which would have been tantamount to a death sentence), or (c.) choose to commit suicide. In the former case (b.), his family would have suffered even before the all-but-certain conviction and execution, and his staff would have been arrested and executed as well. In the latter case (c.), the government would claim that he died a hero and bury him with full military honours, and his family would receive full pension payments. In support of the suicide option, Burgdorf had brought a cyanide capsule.

Rommel opted to commit suicide, and explained his decision to his wife and son. Wearing his Afrika Korps jacket and carrying his field marshal's baton, he got into Burgdorf's car, driven by SS-Stabsscharführer Heinrich Doose, and was driven out of the village. After stopping, Doose and Maisel walked away from the car leaving Rommel with Burgdorf. Five minutes later Burgdorf gestured to the two men to return to the car, and Doose noticed that Rommel was slumped over, having taken the cyanide. He died before being taken to the Wagner-Schule field hospital. Ten minutes later, the group telephoned Rommel's wife to inform her of his death.

The official notice of Rommel's death as reported to the public stated that he had died of either a heart attack or a cerebral embolism—a complication of the skull fractures he had suffered in the earlier strafing of his staff car. To strengthen the story, Hitler ordered an official day of mourning in commemoration of his death. As promised, Rommel was given a state funeral but it was held in Ulm instead of Berlin as had been requested by Rommel. Hitler sent Field Marshal Rundstedt (who was unaware that Rommel had died as a result of Hitler's orders) as his representative to the funeral. 

The truth behind Rommel's death became known to the Allies when intelligence officer Charles Marshall interviewed Rommel's widow, Lucia Rommel, as well as from a letter by Rommel's son Manfred in April 1945.

Rommel's grave is located in Herrlingen, a short distance west of Ulm. For decades after the war on the anniversary of his death, veterans of the Africa campaign, including former opponents, would gather at his tomb in Herrlingen.

Style as military commander 
On the Italian front in the First World War, Rommel was a successful tactician in fast-developing mobile battle and this shaped his subsequent style as a military commander. He found that taking initiative and not allowing the enemy forces to regroup led to victory. Some authors argue that his enemies were often less organised, second-rate, or depleted, and his tactics were less effective against adequately led, trained and supplied opponents and proved insufficient in the later years of the war. Others point out that through his career, he frequently fought while out-numbered and out-gunned, sometimes overwhelmingly so, while having to deal with internal opponents in Germany who hoped that he would fail.

Rommel is praised by numerous authors as a great leader of men. The historian and journalist Basil Liddell Hart concludes that he was a strong leader worshipped by his troops, respected by his adversaries and deserving to be named as one of the "Great Captains of History". Owen Connelly concurs, writing that "No better exemplar of military leadership can be found" and quoting Friedrich von Mellenthin on the inexplicable mutual understanding that existed between Rommel and his troops. Hitler, though, remarked that, "Unfortunately Field-Marshal Rommel is a very great leader full of drive in times of success, but an absolute pessimist when he meets the slightest problems." Telp criticises Rommel for not extending the benevolence he showed in promoting his own officers' careers to his peers, whom he ignored or slighted in his reports.

Taking his opponents by surprise and creating uncertainty in their minds were key elements in Rommel's approach to offensive warfare: he took advantage of sand storms and the dark of night to conceal the movement of his forces. He was aggressive and often directed battle from the front or piloted a reconnaissance aircraft over the lines to get a view of the situation. When the British mounted a commando raid deep behind German lines in an effort to kill Rommel and his staff on the eve of their Crusader offensive, Rommel was indignant that the British expected to find his headquarters  behind his front. Mellenthin and Harald Kuhn write that at times in North Africa his absence from a position of communication made command of the battles of the Afrika Korps difficult. Mellenthin lists Rommel's counterattack during Operation Crusader as one such instance. Butler concurred, saying that leading from the front is a good concept but Rommel took it so far – he frequently directed the actions of a single company or battalion – that he made communication and coordination between units problematic, as well as risking his life to the extent that he could easily have been killed even by his own artillery. Albert Kesselring also complained about Rommel cruising about the battlefield like a division or corps commander; but Gause and Westphal, supporting Rommel, replied that in the African desert only this method would work and that it was useless to try to restrain Rommel anyway. His staff officers, although admiring towards their leader, complained about the self-destructive Spartan lifestyle that made life harder, diminished his effectiveness and forced them to "bab[y] him as unobtrusively as possible".

For his leadership during the French campaign Rommel received both praise and criticism. Many, such as General Georg Stumme, who had previously commanded 7th Panzer Division, were impressed with the speed and success of Rommel's drive. Others were reserved or critical: Kluge, his commanding officer, argued that Rommel's decisions were impulsive and that he claimed too much credit, by falsifying diagrams or by not acknowledging contributions of other units, especially the Luftwaffe. Some pointed out that Rommel's division took the highest casualties in the campaign. Others point out that in exchange for 2,160 casualties and 42 tanks, it captured more than 100,000 prisoners and destroyed nearly two divisions' worth of enemy tanks (about 450 tanks), vehicles and guns.

Rommel spoke German with a pronounced southern German or Swabian accent. He was not a part of the Prussian aristocracy that dominated the German high command, and as such was looked upon somewhat suspiciously by the Wehrmacht's traditional power structure. Rommel felt a commander should be physically more robust than the troops he led, and should always show them an example. He expected his subordinate commanders to do the same.

Rommel was direct, unbending, tough in his manners, to superiors and subordinates alike, disobedient even to Hitler whenever he saw fit, although gentle and diplomatic to the lower ranks. Despite being publicity-friendly, he was also shy, introverted, clumsy and overly formal even to his closest aides, judging people only on their merits, although loyal and considerate to those who had proved reliability, and he displayed a surprisingly passionate and devoted side to a very small few (including Hitler) with whom he had dropped the seemingly impenetrable barriers.

Relationship with Italian forces 

Rommel's relationship with the Italian High Command in North Africa was generally poor. Although he was nominally subordinate to the Italians, he enjoyed a certain degree of autonomy from them; since he was directing their troops in battle as well as his own, this was bound to cause hostility among Italian commanders. Conversely, as the Italian command had control over the supplies of the forces in Africa, they resupplied Italian units preferentially, which was a source of resentment for Rommel and his staff. Rommel's direct and abrasive manner did nothing to smooth these issues.

While certainly much less proficient than Rommel in their leadership, aggressiveness, tactical outlook and mobile warfare skills, Italian commanders were competent in logistics, strategy and artillery doctrine: their troops were ill-equipped but well-trained. As such, the Italian commanders were repeatedly at odds with Rommel over concerns with issues of supply. Field Marshal Kesselring was assigned Supreme Commander Mediterranean, at least in part to alleviate command problems between Rommel and the Italians. This effort resulted only in partial success, with Kesselring's own relationship with the Italians being unsteady and Kesselring claiming Rommel ignored him as readily as he ignored the Italians. Rommel often went directly to Hitler with his needs and concerns, taking advantage of the favouritism that the Führer displayed towards him and adding to the distrust that Kesselring and the German High Command already had of him.

According to Scianna, opinion among the Italian military leaders was not unanimous. In general, Rommel was a target of criticism and a scapegoat for defeat rather than a glorified figure, with certain generals also trying to replace him as the heroic leader or hijack the Rommel myth for their own benefit. Nevertheless, he never became a hated figure, although the "abandonment myth", despite being repudiated by officers of the X Corps themselves, was long-lived. Many found Rommel's chaotic leadership and emotional character hard to work with, yet the Italians held him in higher regard than other German senior commanders, militarily and personally.

Very different, however, was the perception of Rommel by Italian common soldiers and NCOs, who, like the German field troops, had the deepest trust and respect for him. Paolo Colacicchi, an officer in the Italian Tenth Army recalled that Rommel "became sort of a myth to the Italian soldiers". Rommel himself held a much more generous view about the Italian soldier than about their leadership, towards whom his disdain, deeply rooted in militarism, was not atypical, although unlike Kesselring he was incapable of concealing it. Unlike many of his superiors and subordinates who held racist views, he was usually "kindly disposed" to the Italians in general.

James J. Sadkovich cites examples of Rommel abandoning his Italian units, refusing cooperation, rarely acknowledging their achievements and other improper behaviour towards his Italian allies, Giuseppe Mancinelli, who was liaison between German and Italian command, accused Rommel of blaming Italians for his own errors. Sadkovich names Rommel as arrogantly ethnocentric and disdainful towards Italians.'

Views on the conduct of war

Combat 

Many authors describe Rommel as having a reputation of being a chivalrous, humane, and professional officer, and that he earned the respect of both his own troops and his enemies.
Gerhard Schreiber quotes Rommel's orders, issued together with Kesselring: "Sentimentality concerning the Badoglio following gangs ("Banden" in the original, indicating a mob-like crowd) in the uniforms of the former ally is misplaced. Whoever fights against the German soldier has lost any right to be treated well and shall experience toughness reserved for the rabble which betrays friends. Every member of the German troop has to adopt this stance."
Schreiber writes that this exceptionally harsh and, according to him, "hate fuelled" order brutalised the war and was clearly aimed at Italian soldiers, not just partisans. Dennis Showalter writes that "Rommel was not involved in Italy's partisan war, though the orders he issued prescribing death for Italian soldiers taken in arms and Italian civilians sheltering escaped British prisoners do not suggest he would have behaved significantly different from his Wehrmacht counterparts."

According to Maurice Remy, orders issued by Hitler during Rommel's stay in a hospital resulted in massacres in the course of Operation Achse, disarming the Italian forces after the armistice with the Allies in 1943. Remy also states that Rommel treated his Italian opponents with his usual fairness, requiring that the prisoners should be accorded the same conditions as German civilians. Remy opines that an order in which Rommel, in contrast to Hitler's directives, called for no "sentimental scruples" against "Badoglio-dependent bandits in uniforms of the once brothers-in-arms" should not be taken out of context. Peter Lieb agrees that the order did not radicalise the war and that the disarmament in Rommel's area of responsibility happened without major bloodshed. Italian internees were sent to Germany for forced labour, but Rommel was unaware of this. Klaus Schmider comments that the writings of Lieb and others succeed in vindicating Rommel "both with regards to his likely complicity in the July plot as well as his repeated refusal to carry out illegal orders."
Rommel withheld Hitler's Commando Order to execute captured commandos from his Army Group B, with his units reporting that they were treating commandos as regular POWs. It is likely that he had acted similarly in North Africa. Historian Szymon Datner argues that Rommel may have been simply trying to conceal the atrocities of Nazi Germany from the Allies. Remy states that although Rommel had heard rumours about massacres while fighting in Africa, his personality, combined with special circumstances, meant that he was not fully confronted with the reality of atrocities before 1944. When Rommel learned about the atrocities that SS Division Leibstandarte committed in Italy in September 1943, he allegedly forbade his son from joining the Waffen-SS.

Attitude toward colonial troops 

By the time of the Second World War, French colonial troops were portrayed as a symbol of French depravity in Nazi propaganda; Canadian historian Myron Echenberg writes that Rommel, just like Hitler, viewed black French soldiers with particular disdain. According to author Ward Rutherford, Rommel also held racist views towards British colonial troops from India; Rutherford in his The biography of Field Marshal Erwin Rommel writes: "Not even his most sycophantic apologists have been able to evade the conclusion, fully demonstrated by his later behavior, that Rommel was a racist who, for example, thought it desperately unfair that the British should employ 'black' – by which he meant Indian – troops against a white adversary." Vaughn Raspberry writes that Rommel and other officers considered it an insult to fight against black Africans because they considered black people to be members of "inferior races".

Bruce Watson comments that whatever racism Rommel might have had in the beginning, it was washed away when he fought in the desert. When he saw that they were fighting well, he gave the members of the 4th Division of the Indian Army high praise. Rommel and the Germans acknowledge the Gurkhas' fighting ability, although their style leaned more towards ferocity. Once he witnessed German soldiers with throats cut by a khukri knife. Originally, he did not want Chandra Bose's Indian formation (composed of the Allied Indian soldiers), captured by his own troops, to work under his command. In Normandy though, when they had already become the Indische Freiwilligen Legion der Waffen SS, he visited them and praised them for their efforts (while they still suffered general disrespect within the Wehrmacht). A review on Rutherford's book by the Pakistan Army Journal says that the statement is one of many that Rutherford uses, which lack support in authority and analysis. Rommel saying that using the Indians was unfair should also be put in perspective, considering the disbandment of the battle-hardened 4th Division by the Allies. Rommel praised the colonial troops in the battle of France: "The (French) colonial troops fought with extraordinary determination. The anti-tank teams and tank crews performed with courage and caused serious losses." though that might be an example of generals honouring their opponents so that "their own victories appear the more impressive." Reuth comments that Rommel ensured that he and his command would act decently (shown by his treatment of the Free French prisoners who were considered partisans by Hitler, the Jews and the coloured men), while he was distancing himself from Hitler's racist war in the East and deluding himself into believing that Hitler was good, only the Party big shots were evil. The black South African soldiers recount that when they were held as POWs after they were captured by Rommel, they initially slept and queued for food away from the whites, until Rommel saw this and told them that brave soldiers should all queue together. Finding this strange coming from a man fighting for Hitler, they adopted this behaviour until they went back to the Union of South Africa, where they were separated again.

There are reports that Rommel acknowledged the Maori soldiers' fighting skills, yet at the same time he complained about their methods which were unfair from the European perspective. When he asked the commander of the New Zealand 6th Infantry Brigade about his division's massacres of the wounded and POWs, the commander attributed these incidents to the Maoris in his unit. Hew Strachan notes that lapses in practising the warriors' code of war were usually attributed to ethnic groups which lived outside Europe with the implication that those ethnic groups which lived in Europe knew how to behave (although Strachan opines that such attributions were probably true). Nevertheless, according to the website of the 28th Maori Battalion, Rommel always treated them fairly and he also showed understanding with regard to war crimes.

Politics 
Some authors cite, among other cases, Rommel's naive reaction to events in Poland while he was there: he paid a visit to his wife's uncle, famous Polish priest and patriotic leader,  who was murdered within days, but Rommel never understood this and, at his wife's urgings, kept writing letter after letter to Himmler's adjutants asking them to keep track and take care of their relative. Knopp and Mosier agree that he was naive politically, citing his request for a Jewish Gauleiter in 1943. Despite this, Lieb finds it hard to believe that a man in Rommel's position could have known nothing about atrocities, while accepting that locally he was separated from the places where these atrocities occurred. Der Spiegel comments that Rommel was simply in denial about what happened around him. Alaric Searle points out that it was the early diplomatic successes and bloodless expansion that blinded Rommel to the true nature of his beloved Führer, whom he then naively continued to support. Scheck believes it may be forever unclear whether Rommel recognised the unprecedented depraved character of the regime.

Civilians 
Historian Richard J. Evans has stated that German soldiers in Tunisia raped Jewish women, and the success of Rommel's forces in capturing or securing Allied, Italian and Vichy French territory in North Africa led to many Jews in these areas being killed by other German institutions as part of the Holocaust. Anti-Jewish and Anti-Arab violence erupted in North Africa when Rommel and Ettore Bastico regained territory there in February 1941 and then again in April 1942. While committed by Italian forces, Patrick Bernhard writes "the Germans were aware of Italian reprisals behind the front lines. Yet, perhaps surprisingly, they seem to have exercised little control over events.

The German consul general in Tripoli consulted with Italian state and party officials about possible countermeasures against the natives, but this was the full extent of German involvement. Rommel did not directly intervene, though he advised the Italian authorities to do whatever was necessary to eliminate the danger of riots and espionage; for the German general, the rear areas were to be kept "quiet" at all costs. Thus, according to Bernhard, although he had no direct hand in the atrocities, Rommel made himself complicit in war crimes by failing to point out that international laws of war strictly prohibited certain forms of retaliation. By giving carte blanche to the Italians, Rommel implicitly condoned, and perhaps even encouraged, their war crimes". Gershom reports that the recommendation came from officers "speaking for Rommel", and comments, "Perhaps Rommel did not know or care about the specifics; perhaps his motivation was not hate but dispassionate efficiency. The distinctions would have escaped the men hanging from hooks."

In his article Im Rücken Rommels. Kriegsverbrechen, koloniale Massengewalt und Judenverfolgung in Nordafrika, Bernhard writes that North African campaign was hardly "war without hate" as Rommel described it, and points out rapes of women, ill treatment and executions of captured POWs, as well as racially motivated murders of Arabs, Berbers and Jews, in addition to establishment of concentration camps. Bernhard again cites discussion among the German and Italian authorities about Rommel's position regarding countermeasures against local insurrection (according to them, Rommel wanted to eliminate the danger at all costs) to show that Rommel fundamentally approved of Italian policy in the matter. Bernhard opines that Rommel had informal power over the matter because his military success brought him influence on the Italian authorities.

United States Holocaust Memorial Museum describes relationship between Rommel and the proposed Einsatzgruppen Egypt as "problematic". The Museum states that this unit was to be tasked with murdering Jewish population of North Africa, Palestine, and it was to be attached directly to Rommel's Afrika Korps. According to the museum Rauff met with Rommel's staff in 1942 as part of preparations for this plan. The Museum states that Rommel was certainly aware that planning was taking place, even if his reaction to it isn't recorded, and while the main proposed Einsatzgruppen were never set in action, smaller units did murder Jews in North Africa.

On the other hand, Christopher Gabel remarks that Richards Evans seems to attempt to prove that Rommel was a war criminal by association but fails to produce evidence that he had actual or constructive knowledge about said crimes. Ben H. Shepherd comments that Rommel showed insight and restraint when dealing with the nomadic Arabs, the only civilians who occasionally intervened into the war and thus risked reprisals as a result. Shepherd cites a request by Rommel to the Italian High Command, in which he complained about excesses against the Arabic population and noted that reprisals without identifying the real culprits were never expedient.

The documentary Rommel's War (Rommels Krieg), made by Caron and Müllner with advice from Sönke Neitzel, states that even though it is not clear whether Rommel knew about the crimes (in Africa) or not, "his military success made possible forced labor, torture and robbery. Rommel's war is always part of Hitler's war of worldviews, whether Rommel wanted it or not." More specifically, several German historians have revealed existence of plans to exterminate Jews in Egypt and Palestine, if Rommel had succeeded in his goal of invading the Middle East during 1942 by SS unit embedded to Afrika Korps.

According to Mallmann and Cüppers, a post-war CIA report described Rommel as having met with Walther Rauff, who was responsible for the unit, and been disgusted after learning about the plan from him and as having sent him on his way; but they conclude that such a meeting is hardly possible as Rauff was sent to report to Rommel at Tobruk on 20 July and Rommel was then 500 km away conducting the First El Alamein. On 29 July, Rauff's unit was sent to Athens, expecting to enter Africa when Rommel crossed the Nile. However, in view of the Axis' deteriorating situation in Africa it returned to Germany in September.

Historian Jean-Christoph Caron opines that there is no evidence that Rommel knew or would have supported Rauff's mission; he also believes Rommel bore no direct responsibility regarding the SS's looting of gold in Tunisia. Historian Haim Saadon, Director of the Center of Research on North African Jewry in WWII, goes further, stating that there was no extermination plan: Rauff's documents show that his foremost concern was helping the Wehrmacht to win, and he came up with the idea of forced labour camps in the process. By the time these labour camps were in operation, according to Ben H. Shepherd, Rommel had already been retreating and there is no proof of his contact with the Einsatzkommando.

Haaretz comments that the CIA report is most likely correct regarding both the interaction between Rommel and Rauff and Rommel's objections to the plan: Rauff's assistant Theodor Saevecke, and declassified information from Rauff's file, both report the same story. Haaretz also remarks that Rommel's influence probably softened the Nazi authorities' attitude to the Jews and to the civilian population generally in North Africa.

Rolf-Dieter Müller comments that the war in North Africa, while as bloody as any other war, differed considerably from the war of annihilation in eastern Europe, because it was limited to a narrow coastline and hardly affected the population.

Showalter writes that: "From the desert campaign’s beginning, both sides consciously sought to wage a "clean" war—war without hate, as Rommel put it in his reflections. Explanations include the absence of civilians and the relative absence of Nazis; the nature of the environment, which conveyed a "moral simplicity and transparency"; and the control of command on both sides by prewar professionals, producing a British tendency to depict war in the imagery of a game, and the corresponding German pattern of seeing it as a test of skill and a proof of virtue. The nature of the fighting as well diminished the last-ditch, close-quarter actions that are primary nurturers of mutual bitterness. A battalion overrun by tanks usually had its resistance broken so completely that nothing was to be gained by a broken-backed final stand."

Joachim Käppner writes that while the conflict in North Africa was not as bloody as in Eastern Europe, the Afrika Korps committed some war crimes. Historian Martin Kitchen states that the reputation of the Afrika Korps was preserved by circumstances: The sparsely populated desert areas did not lend themselves to ethnic cleansing; the German forces never reached the large Jewish populations in Egypt and Palestine; and in the urban areas of Tunisia and Tripolitania the Italian government constrained the German efforts to discriminate against or eliminate Jews who were Italian citizens. Despite this, the North African Jews themselves believed that it was Rommel who prevented the "Final Solution" from being carried out against them when German might dominated North Africa from Egypt to Morocco. According to Curtis and Remy, 120,000 Jews lived in Algeria, 200,000 in Morocco, about 80,000 in Tunisia. Remy writes that this number was unchanged following the German invasion of Tunisia in 1942 while Curtis notes that 5000 of these Jews would be sent to forced labour camps. and 26,000 in Libya.

Hein Klemann writes that the confiscations in the "foraging zone" of Afrika Korps threatened the survival chances of local civilians, just as plunder enacted by Wehrmacht in Soviet Union

In North Africa Rommel's troops laid down landmines, which in decades to come killed and maimed thousands of civilians. Since statistics started in 1980s, 3,300 people have lost their lives, and 7,500 maimed There are disputed whether the landmines in El Alamein, which constitute the most notable portion of landmines left over from World War II, were left by the Afrika Korps or the British Army led by Field Marshal Montgomery. Egypt has not joined the Mine Ban Treaty until this day.

Rommel sharply protested the Jewish policies and other immoralities and was an opponent of the Gestapo He also refused to comply with Hitler's order to execute Jewish POWs. Bryan Mark Rigg writes: "The only place in the army where one might find a place of refuge was in the Deutsches Afrika-Korps (DAK) under the leadership of the "Desert Fox," Field Marshal Erwin Rommel. According to this study's files, his half-Jews were not as affected by the racial laws as most others serving on the European continent." He notes, though, that "Perhaps Rommel failed to enforce the order to discharge half-Jews because he was unaware of it".

Captain Horst van Oppenfeld (a staff officer to Colonel Claus von Stauffenberg and a quarter-Jew) says that Rommel did not concern himself with the racial decrees and he had never experienced any trouble caused by his ancestry during his time in the DAK even if Rommel never personally interfered on his behalf. Another quarter-Jew, Fritz Bayerlein, became a famous general and Rommel's chief-of-staff, despite also being a bisexual, which made his situation even more precarious.

Building the Atlantic Wall was officially the responsibility of the Organisation Todt, which was not under Rommel's command, but he enthusiastically joined the task, protesting slave labour and suggesting that they should recruit French civilians and pay them good wages. Despite this, French civilians and Italian prisoners of war held by the Germans were forced by officials under the Vichy government, the Todt Organization and the SS forces to work on building some of the defences Rommel requested, in appalling conditions according to historian Will Fowler. Although they got basic wages, the workers complained because it was too little and there was no heavy equipment. 

German troops worked almost round-the-clock under very harsh conditions, with Rommel's rewards being accordions.}

Rommel was one of the commanders who protested the Oradour-sur-Glane massacre.

Reputation as a military commander 

Rommel was famous in his lifetime, including among his adversaries. His tactical prowess and decency in the treatment of Allied prisoners earned him the respect of opponents including Claude Auchinleck, Archibald Wavell, George S. Patton, and Bernard Montgomery.

Rommel's military reputation has been controversial. While nearly all military practitioners acknowledge Rommel's excellent tactical skills and personal bravery, some, such as U.S. major general and military historian David T. Zabecki of the United States Naval Institute, considers Rommel's performance as an operational level commander to be highly overrated and that other officers share this belief. General Klaus Naumann, who served as Chief of Staff of the Bundeswehr, agrees with the military historian Charles Messenger that Rommel had challenges at the operational level, and states that Rommel's violation of the unity of command principle, bypassing the chain of command in Africa, was unacceptable and contributed to the eventual operational and strategic failure in North Africa. The German biographer Wolf Heckmann describes Rommel as "the most overrated commander of an army in world history".

Nevertheless, there is also a notable number of officers who admire his methods, like Norman Schwarzkopf who described Rommel as a genius at battles of movement saying "Look at Rommel. Look at North Africa, the Arab-Israeli wars, and all the rest of them. A war in the desert is a war of mobility and lethality. It's not a war where straight lines are drawn in the sand and [you] say, 'I will defend here or die." Ariel Sharon deemed the German military model used by Rommel to be superior to the British model used by Montgomery. His compatriot Moshe Dayan likewise considered Rommel a model and icon. Wesley Clark states that "Rommel's military reputation, though, has lived on, and still sets the standard for a style of daring, charismatic leadership to which most officers aspire." During the recent desert wars, Rommel's military theories and experiences attracted great interest from policy makers and military instructors. Chinese military leader Sun Li-jen had the laudatory nickname "Rommel of the East".
Certain modern military historians, such as Larry T. Addington, Niall Barr, Douglas Porch and Robert Citino, are sceptical of Rommel as an operational, let alone strategic level commander. They point to Rommel's lack of appreciation for Germany's strategic situation, his misunderstanding of the relative importance of his theatre to the German High Command, his poor grasp of logistical realities, and, according to the historian Ian Beckett, his "penchant for glory hunting". Citino credits Rommel's limitations as an operational level commander as "materially contributing" to the eventual demise of the Axis forces in North Africa, while Addington focuses on the struggle over strategy, whereby Rommel's initial brilliant success resulted in "catastrophic effects" for Germany in North Africa. Porch highlights Rommel's "offensive mentality", symptomatic of the Wehrmacht commanders as a whole in the belief that the tactical and operational victories would lead to strategic success. Compounding the problem was the Wehrmacht's institutional tendency to discount logistics, industrial output and their opponents' capacity to learn from past mistakes.

The historian Geoffrey P. Megargee points out Rommel's playing the German and Italian command structures against each other to his advantage. Rommel used the confused structure—the High command of the armed forces, the OKH (Supreme High Command of the Army) and the Comando Supremo (Italian Supreme Command)—to disregard orders that he disagreed with or to appeal to whatever authority he felt would be most sympathetic to his requests.

Some historians take issue with Rommel's absence from Normandy on the day of the Allied invasion, 6 June 1944. He had left France on 5 June and was at home on the 6th celebrating his wife's birthday. (According to Rommel, he planned to proceed to see Hitler the next day to discuss the situation in Normandy). Zabecki calls his decision to leave the theatre in view of an imminent invasion "an incredible lapse of command responsibility". Lieb remarks that Rommel displayed real mental agility, but the lack of an energetic commander, together with other problems, caused the battle largely not to be conducted in his concept (which is the opposite of the German doctrine), although the result was still better than Geyr's plan. Lieb also opines that while his harshest critics (who mostly came from the General Staff) often said that Rommel was overrated or not suitable for higher commands, envy was a big factor here.
 
T.L. McMahon argues that while Rommel no doubt possessed operational vision, he did not have the strategic resources to effect his operational choices while his forces provided the tactical ability to accomplish his goals, and the German staff and system of staff command were designed for commanders who led from the front, and in some cases he might have chosen the same options as Montgomery (a reputedly strategy-oriented commander) had he been put in the same conditions. According to Steven Zaloga, tactical flexibility was a great advantage of the German system, but in the final years of the war, Hitler and his cronies like Himmler and Goering had usurped more and more authority at the strategic level, leaving professionals like Rommel increasing constraints on their actions. Martin Blumenson considers Rommel a general with a compelling view of strategy and logistics, which was demonstrated through his many arguments with his superiors over such matters, although Blumenson also thinks that what distinguished Rommel was his boldness, his intuitive feel for the battlefield.(Upon which Schwarzkopf also comments "Rommel had a feel for the battlefield like no other man.")

Joseph Forbes comments that: "The complex, conflict-filled interaction between Rommel and his superiors over logistics, objectives and priorities should not be used to detract from Rommel's reputation as a remarkable military leader", because Rommel was not given powers over logistics, and because if only generals who attain strategic-policy goals are great generals, such highly regarded commanders as Robert E. Lee, Hannibal, Charles XII would have to be excluded from that list. General Siegfried F. Storbeck, Deputy Inspector General of the Bundeswehr (1987–1991), remarks that, Rommel's leadership style and offensive thinking, although carrying inherent risks like losing the overview of the situation and creating overlapping of authority, have been proved effective, and have been analysed and incorporated in the training of officers by "us, our Western allies, the Warsaw Pact, and even the Israel Defense Forces". Maurice Remy defends his strategic decision regarding Malta as, although risky, the only logical choice.

Rommel was among the few Axis commanders (the others being Isoroku Yamamoto and Reinhard Heydrich) who were targeted for assassination by Allied planners. Two attempts were made, the first being Operation Flipper in North Africa in 1941, and the second being Operation Gaff in Normandy in 1944.

Research by Norman Ohler claims that Rommel's behaviours were heavily influenced by Pervitin which he reportedly took in heavy doses, to such an extent that Ohler refers to him as "the Crystal Fox" ("Kristallfuchs") – playing off the nickname "Desert Fox" famously given to him by the British.

Debate about atrocities

Executions of prisoners in France 

In France, Rommel ordered the execution of one French officer who refused three times to cooperate when being taken prisoner; there are disputes as to whether this execution was justified. Caddick-Adams comments that this would make Rommel a war criminal condemned by his own hand, and that other authors overlook this episode. Butler notes that the officer refused to surrender three times and thus died in a courageous but foolhardy way. French historian Petitfrère remarks that Rommel was in a hurry and had no time for useless palavers, although this act was still debatable. Telp remarks that, "he treated prisoners of war with consideration. On one occasion, he was forced to order the shooting of a French lieutenant-colonel for refusing to obey his captors." Scheck says, "Although there is no evidence incriminating Rommel himself, his unit did fight in areas where German massacres of black French prisoners of war were extremely common in June 1940."

There are reports that during the fighting in France, Rommel's 7th Panzer Division committed atrocities against surrendering French troops and captured prisoners of war. The atrocities, according to Martin S. Alexander, included the murder of 50 surrendering officers and men at Quesnoy and the nearby Airaines. According to Richardot, on 7 June, the commanding French officer Charles N'Tchoréré and his company surrendered to the 7th Panzer Division. He was then executed by the 25th Infantry Regiment (the 7th Panzer Division did not have a 25th Infantry Regiment). Journalist Alain Aka states simply that he was executed by one of Rommel's soldiers and his body was driven over by tank. Erwan Bergot reports that he was killed by the SS. Historian John Morrow states he was shot in the neck by a Panzer officer, without mentioning the unit of the perpetrators of this crime. The website of the National Federation of Volunteer Servicemen (F.N.C.V., France) states that N'Tchoréré was pushed against the wall and, despite protests from his comrades and newly liberated German prisoners, was shot by the SS. Elements of the division are considered by Scheck to have been "likely" responsible for the murder of POWs in Hangest-sur-Somme, while Scheck reports that they were too far away to have been involved in the massacres at Airaines and nearby villages. Scheck says that the German units fighting there came from the 46th and 2nd Infantry Division, and possibly from the 6th and 27th Infantry Division as well. Scheck also writes that there were no SS units in the area. Morrow, citing Scheck, says that the 7th Panzer Division carried out "cleansing operations". French historian Dominique Lormier counts the number of victims of the 7th Panzer Division in Airaines at 109, mostly French-African soldiers from Senegal. Showalter writes: "In fact, the garrison of Le Quesnoy, most of them Senegalese, took heavy toll of the German infantry in house-to-house fighting. Unlike other occasions in 1940, when Germans and Africans met, there was no deliberate massacre of survivors. Nevertheless, the riflemen took few prisoners, and the delay imposed by the tirailleurs forced the Panzers to advance unsupported until Rommel was ordered to halt for fear of coming under attack by Stukas." Claus Telp comments that Airaines was not in the sector of the 7th, but at Hangest and Martainville, elements of the 7th might have shot some prisoners and used British Colonel Broomhall as a human shield (although Telp is of the opinion that it was unlikely that Rommel approved of, or even knew about, these two incidents). Historian David Stone notes that acts of shooting surrendered prisoners were carried out by Rommel's 7th Panzer Division and observes contradictory statements in Rommel's account of the events; Rommel initially wrote that "any enemy troops were wiped out or forced to withdraw" but also added that "many prisoners taken were hopelessly drunk." Stone attributes the massacres of soldiers from the 53ème Regiment d'Infanterie Coloniale (N'Tchoréré's unit) on 7 June to the 5th Infantry Division. Historian Daniel Butler agrees that it was possible that the massacre at Le Quesnoy happened given the existence of Nazis, such as Hanke, in Rommel's division, while stating that in comparison with other German units, few sources regarding such actions of the men of the 7th Panzer exist. Butler believes that "it's almost impossible to imagine" Rommel authorising or countenancing such actions. He also writes that "Some accusers have twisted a remark in Rommel's own account of the action in the village of Le Quesnoy as proof that he at least tacitly condoned the executions—'any enemy troops were either wiped out or forced to withdraw'—but the words themselves as well as the context of the passage hardly support the contention."

Treatment of Jews and other civilians in North Africa

Giordana Terracina writes that: "On April 3, the Italians recaptured Benghazi and a few months later the Afrika Korps led by Rommel was sent to Libya and began the deportation of the Jews of Cyrenaica in the concentration camp of Giado and other smaller towns in Tripolitania. This measure was accompanied by shooting, also in Benghazi, of some Jews guilty of having welcomed the British troops, on their arrival, treating them as liberators." Gershom states that Italian authorities were responsible for bringing Jews into their concentration camps, which were "not built to exterminate its inmates", yet as the water and food supply was meager, were not built to keep humans alive either. Also according to Gershom, the German consul in Tripoli knew about the process and trucks used to transport supply to Rommel were sometimes used to transport Jews, despite all problems the German forces were having. The Jerusalem Posts review of Gershom Gorenberg's War of shadows writes that: "The Italians were far more brutal with civilians, including Libyan Jews, than Rommel’s Afrika Korps, which by all accounts abided by the laws of war. But nobody worried that the Italians who sent Jews to concentration camps in Libya, would invade British-held Egypt, let alone Mandatory Palestine."

According to German historian , Rommel forbade his soldiers from buying anything from the Jewish population of Tripoli, used Jewish slave labour and commanded Jews to clear out minefields by walking on them ahead of his forces. According to Proske, some of the Libyan Jews were eventually sent to concentration camps. Historians Christian Schweizer and Peter Lieb note that: "Over the last few years, even though the social science teacher Wolfgang Proske has sought to participate in the discussion [on Rommel] with very strong opinions, his biased submissions are not scientifically received." The Heidenheimer Zeitung notes that Proske was the publisher of his main work Täter, Helfer, Trittbrettfahrer – NS-Belastete von der Ostalb, after failing to have it published by another publisher.

According to historian Michael Wolffsohn, during the Africa campaign, preparations for committing genocide against the North African Jews were in full swing and a thousand of them were transported to East European concentration camps. At the same time, he recommends the Bundeswehr to keep the names and traditions associated with Rommel (although Wolffsohn opines that focus should be put on the politically thoughtful soldier he became at the end of his life, rather than the swashbuckler and the humane rogue).

Robert Satloff writes in his book Among the Righteous: Lost Stories from the Holocaust's Long Reach into Arab Lands that as the German and Italian forces retreated across Libya towards Tunisia, the Jewish population became victim upon which they released their anger and frustration. According to Satloff Afrika Korps soldiers plundered Jewish property all along the Libyan coast. This violence and persecution only came to an end with the arrival of General Montgomery in Tripoli on 23 January 1943. According to Maurice Remy, although there were antisemitic individuals in the Afrika Korps, actual cases of abuse are not known, even against the Jewish soldiers of the Eighth Army. Remy quotes Isaac Levy, the Senior Jewish Chaplain of the Eighth Army, as saying that he had never seen "any sign or hint that the soldiers [of the Afrika Korps] are antisemitic.". The Telegraph comments: "Accounts suggest that it was not Field Marshal Erwin Rommel but the ruthless SS colonel Walter Rauff who stripped Tunisian Jews of their wealth."

Commenting on Rommel's conquest of Tunisia, Marvin Perry writes that: "The bridgehead Rommel established in Tunisia enabled the SS to herd Jews into slave labor camps."

Der Spiegel writes that: "The SS had established a network of labor camps in Tunisia. More than 2,500 Tunisian Jews died in six months of German rule, and the regular army was also involved in executions." Caron writes on Der Spiegel that the camps were organised in early December 1942 by Nehring, the commander in Tunisia, and Rauff, while Rommel was retreating. As commander of the German Afrika Korps, Nehring would continue to use Tunisian forced labour. Historian Clemens Vollnhals writes that use of Jews by Afrika Korps as forced labour is barely known, but it did happen alongside persecution of Jewish population (although on smaller scale than in Europe) and some of the labourers have died. According to Caddick-Adams, no Waffen-SS served under Rommel in Africa at any time and most of the activities of Rauff's detachment happened after Rommel's departure. Shepherd notes that during this time Rommel was retreating and there is no evidence that he had contact with the Einsatzkommando Klaus-Michael Mallmann, Martin Cüppers Smith Addressing the call of some authors to contextualise Rommel's actions in Italy and North Africa, Wolfgang Mährle notes that while it is undeniable that Rommel played the role of a Generalfeldmarschall in a criminal war, this only illustrates in a limited way his personal attitude and the actions resulted from that.

Alleged treasure and spoils
According to several historians, allegations and stories that associate Rommel and the Afrika Korps with the harassing and plundering of Jewish gold and property in Tunisia are usually known under the name "Rommel's treasure" or "Rommel's gold". Michael FitzGerald comments that the treasure should be named more accurately as Rauff's gold, as Rommel had nothing to do with its acquisition or removal. Jean-Christoph Caron comments that the treasure legend has a real core and that Jewish property was looted by the SS in Tunisia and later might have been hidden or sunken around the port city of Corsica, where Rauff was stationed in 1943. The person who gave birth to the full-blown legend was the SS soldier Walter Kirner, who presented a false map to the French authorities. Caron and Jörg Müllner, his co-author of the ZDF documentary Rommel's treasure (Rommels Schatz) tell Die Welt that "Rommel had nothing to do with the treasure, but his name is assocỉated with everything that happened in the war in Africa."

Rick Atkinson criticises Rommel for gaining a looted stamp collection (a bribe from Sepp Dietrich) and a villa taken from Jews. Lucas, Matthews and Remy though describe the contemptuous and angry reaction of Rommel towards Dietrich's act and the lootings and other brutal behaviours of the SS that he had discovered in Italy. Claudia Hecht also explains that although the Stuttgart and Ulm authorities did arrange for the Rommel family to use a villa whose Jewish owners had been forced out two years earlier, for a brief period after their own house had been destroyed by Allied bombing, ownership of it was never transferred to them. Butler notes that Rommel was one of the few who refused large estates and gifts of cash Hitler gave to his generals.

 In Nazi and Allied propaganda 
At the beginning, although Hitler and Goebbels took particular notice of Rommel, the Nazi elites had no intent to create one major war symbol (partly out of fear that he would offset Hitler), generating huge propaganda campaigns for not only Rommel but also Gerd von Rundstedt, Walther von Brauchitsch, Eduard Dietl, Sepp Dietrich (the latter two were party members and also strongly supported by Hitler), etc. Nevertheless, a multitude of factors—including Rommel's unusual charisma, his talents both in military matters and public relations,, the efforts of Goebbels's propaganda machine, and the Allies' participation in mythologising his life (either for political benefits, sympathy for someone who evoked a romantic archetype, or genuine admiration for his actions)—gradually contributed to Rommel's fame. Spiegel wrote, "Even back then his fame outshone that of all other commanders."

Rommel's victories in France were featured in the German press and in the February 1941 film Sieg im Westen (Victory in the West), in which Rommel personally helped direct a segment re-enacting the crossing of the Somme River.According to Scheck, although there is no evidence of Rommel committing crimes, during the shooting of the movie, African prisoners of war, were forced to take part in its making, and forced to carry out humiliating acts.French Colonial Soldiers in German Captivity during World War II, page 42, Raffael Scheck Stills from the re-enactment are found in "Rommel Collection"; it was filmed by Hans Ertl, assigned to this task by Dr. Kurt Hesse, a personal friend of Rommel, who worked for Wehrmacht Propaganda Section V  Rommel's victories in 1941 were played up by the Nazi propaganda, even though his successes in North Africa were achieved in arguably one of Germany's least strategically important theatres of World War II. In November 1941, Reich Minister of Propaganda Joseph Goebbels wrote about "the urgent need" to have Rommel "elevated to a kind of popular hero." Rommel, with his innate abilities as a military commander and love of the spotlight, was a perfect fit for the role Goebbels designed for him.

 Successes in North Africa 
In North Africa, Rommel received help in cultivating his image from Alfred Ingemar Berndt, a senior official at the Reich Propaganda Ministry who had volunteered for military service. Seconded by Goebbels, Berndt was assigned to Rommel's staff and became one of his closest aides. Berndt often acted as liaison between Rommel, the Propaganda Ministry, and the Führer Headquarters. He directed Rommel's photo shoots and filed radio dispatches describing the battles.

In the spring of 1941, Rommel's name began to appear in the British media. In the autumn of 1941 and early winter of 1941/1942, he was mentioned in the British press almost daily. Toward the end of the year, the Reich propaganda machine also used Rommel's successes in Africa as a diversion from the Wehrmacht's challenging situation in the Soviet Union with the stall of Operation Barbarossa. The American press soon began to take notice of Rommel as well, following the country's entry into the war on 11 December 1941, writing that "The British (...) admire him because he beat them and were surprised to have beaten in turn such a capable general." General Auchinleck distributed a directive to his commanders seeking to dispel the notion that Rommel was a "superman". Rommel, no matter how hard the situation was, made a deliberate effort at always spending some time with soldiers and patients, his own and POWs alike, which contributed greatly to his reputation of not only being a great commander but also "a decent chap" among the troops.

The attention of the Western and especially the British press thrilled Goebbels, who wrote in his diary in early 1942: "Rommel continues to be the recognized darling of even the enemies' news agencies." The Field Marshal was pleased by the media attention, although he knew the downsides of having a reputation. Hitler took note of the British propaganda as well, commenting in the summer of 1942 that Britain's leaders must have hoped "to be able to explain their defeat to their own nation more easily by focusing on Rommel".

The Field Marshal was the German commander most frequently covered in the German media, and the only one to be given a press conference, which took place in October 1942. The press conference was moderated by Goebbels and was attended by both domestic and foreign media. Rommel declared: "Today we (...) have the gates of Egypt in hand, and with the intent to act!" Keeping the focus on Rommel distracted the German public from Wehrmacht losses elsewhere as the tide of the war began to turn. He became a symbol that was used to reinforce the German public's faith in an ultimate Axis victory.

 Military reverses 
In the wake of the successful British offensive in November 1942 and other military reverses, the Propaganda Ministry directed the media to emphasise Rommel's invincibility. The charade was maintained until the spring of 1943, even as the German situation in Africa became increasingly precarious. To ensure that the inevitable defeat in Africa would not be associated with Rommel's name, Goebbels had the Army High Command announce in May 1943 that Rommel was on a two-month leave for health reasons. Instead, the campaign was presented by Berndt, who resumed his role in the Propaganda Ministry, as a ruse to tie down the British Empire while Germany was turning Europe into an impenetrable fortress with Rommel at the helm of this success. After the radio programme ran in May 1943, Rommel sent Berndt a case of cigars as a sign of his gratitude.

Although Rommel then entered a period without a significant command, he remained a household name in Germany, synonymous with the aura of invincibility. Hitler then made Rommel part of his defensive strategy for Fortress Europe (Festung Europa) by sending him to the West to inspect fortifications along the Atlantic Wall. Goebbels supported the decision, noting in his diary that Rommel was "undoubtedly the suitable man" for the task. The propaganda minister expected the move to reassure the German public and at the same time to have a negative impact on the Allied forces' morale.

In France, a Wehrmacht propaganda company frequently accompanied Rommel on his inspection trips to document his work for both domestic and foreign audiences. In May 1944 the German newsreels reported on Rommel's speech at a Wehrmacht conference, where he stated his conviction that "every single German soldier will make his contribution against the Anglo-American spirit that it deserves for its criminal and bestial air war campaign against our homeland." The speech led to an upswing in morale and sustained confidence in Rommel.

When Rommel was seriously wounded on 17 July 1944, the Propaganda Ministry undertook efforts to conceal the injury so as not to undermine domestic morale. Despite those, the news leaked to the British press. To counteract the rumours of a serious injury and even death, Rommel was required to appear at 1 August press conference. On 3 August, the German press published an official report that Rommel had been injured in a car accident. Rommel noted in his diary his dismay at this twisting of the truth, belatedly realising how much the Reich propaganda was using him for its own ends.

 Rommel's views on propaganda 
Rommel was interested in propaganda beyond the promotion of his own image. In 1944, after visiting Rommel in France and reading his proposals on counteracting Allied propaganda, Alfred-Ingemar Berndt remarked: "He is also interested in this propaganda business and wants to develop it by all means. He has even thought and brought out practical suggestions for each program and subject."

Rommel saw the propaganda and education values in his and his nation's deeds (He also did value justice itself; according to Admiral Ruge's diary, Rommel told Ruge: "Justice is the indispensable foundation of a nation. Unfortunately, the higher-ups are not clean. The slaughterings are grave sins.") The key to the successful creating of an image, according to Rommel, was leading by example: "The men tend to feel no kind of contact with a commander who, they know, is sitting somewhere in headquarters. What they want is what might be termed a physical contact with him. In moments of panic, fatigue, or disorganization, or when something out of the ordinary has to be demanded from them, the personal example of the commander works wonders, especially if he has had the wit to create some sort of legend around himself." He urged Axis authorities to treat the Arab with the utmost respect to prevent uprisings behind the front. He protested the use of propaganda at the cost of explicit military benefits though, criticising Hitler's headquarters for being unable to tell the German people and the world that El Alamein had been lost and preventing the evacuation of the German forces in Northern Africa in the process. Ruge suggests that his chief treated his own fame as a kind of weapon.

In 1943, he surprised Hitler by proposing that a Jew should be made into a Gauleiter to prove to the world that Germany was innocent of accusations that Rommel had heard from the enemy's propaganda regarding the mistreatment of Jews. Hitler replied, "Dear Rommel, you understand nothing about my thinking at all."

 Relationship with Nazism 

Rommel was not a member of the Nazi Party. Rommel and Hitler had a close and genuine, if complicated, personal relationship. Rommel, as other Wehrmacht officers, welcomed the Nazi rise to power. Numerous historians state that Rommel was one of Hitler's favourite generals and that his close relationship with the dictator benefited both his inter-war and war-time career. Robert Citino describes Rommel as "not apolitical" and writes that he owed his career to Hitler, to whom Rommel's attitude was "worshipful", with Messenger agreeing that Rommel owed his tank command, his hero status and other promotions to Hitler's interference and support.

Kesselring described Rommel's own power over Hitler as "hypnotic". In 1944, Rommel himself told Ruge and his wife that Hitler had a kind of irresistible magnetic aura ("Magnetismus") and was always seemingly in an intoxicated condition. Maurice Remy identifies that the point at which their relationship became a personal one was 1939, when Rommel proudly announced to his friend Kurt Hesse that he had "sort of forced Hitler to go with me (to the Hradschin Castle in Prague, in an open top car, without another bodyguard), under my personal protection ... He had entrusted himself to me and would never forget me for my excellent advice."

The close relationship between Rommel and Hitler continued following the Western campaign; after Rommel sent to him a specially prepared diary on the 7th Division, he received a letter of thanks from the dictator. (According to Speer, he would normally send extremely unclear reports which annoyed Hitler greatly.) According to Maurice Remy, the relationship, which Remy calls "a dream marriage", showed the first crack only in 1942, and later gradually turned into, in the words of German writer Ernst Jünger (in contact with Rommel in Normandy), "Haßliebe" (a love-hate relationship). Ruge's diary and Rommel's letters to his wife show his mood fluctuating wildly regarding Hitler: while he showed disgust towards the atrocities and disappointment towards the situation, he was overjoyed to welcome a visit from Hitler, only to return to depression the next day when faced with reality.

Hitler displayed the same emotions. Amid growing doubts and differences, he would remain eager for Rommel's calls (they had almost daily, hour-long, highly animated conversations, with the preferred topic being technical innovations): he once almost grabbed the telephone out of Linge's hand. But, according to Linge, seeing Rommel's disobedience Hitler also realised his mistake in building up Rommel, whom not only the Afrika Korps but also the German people in general now considered the German God. Hitler tried to fix the dysfunctional relationship many times without results, with Rommel calling his attempts "Sunlamp Treatment", although later he said that "Once I have loved the Führer, and I still do." Remy and Der Spiegel remark that the statement was very much genuine, while Watson notes that Rommel believed he deserved to die for his treasonable plan.

Rommel was an ambitious man who took advantage of his proximity to Hitler and willingly accepted the propaganda campaigns designed for him by Goebbels. On one hand, he wanted personal promotion and the realisation of his ideals. On the other hand, being elevated by the traditional system that gave preferential treatment to aristocratic officers would be betrayal of his aspiration "to remain a man of the troops". In 1918, Rommel refused an invitation to a prestigious officer training course, and with it, the chance to be promoted to general. Additionally, he had no inclination towards the political route, preferring to remain a soldier ("Nur-Soldat"). He was thus attracted by the Common Man theme which promised to level German society, the glorification of the national community, and the idea of a soldier of common background who served the Fatherland with talent and got rewarded by another common man who embodied the will of the German people. While he had much indignation towards Germany's contemporary class problem, this self-association with the Common Man went along well with his desire to simulate the knights of the past, who also led from the front. Rommel seemed to enjoy the idea of peace, as shown by his words to his wife in August 1939: "You can trust me, we have taken part in one World War, but as long as our generation live, there will not be a second", as well as his letter sent to her the night before the Invasion of Poland, in which he expressed (in Maurice Remy's phrase) "boundless optimism": "I still believe the atmosphere will not become more bellicose." Butler remarks that Rommel was center in his politics, leaning a little to the left in his attitude.

Messenger argues that Rommel's attitude towards Hitler changed only after the Allied invasion of Normandy, when Rommel came to realise that the war could not be won, while Maurice Remy suggests that Rommel never truly broke away from the relationship with Hitler but praises him for "always [having] the courage to oppose him whenever his conscience required so". The historian Peter Lieb states that it was not clear whether the threat of defeat was the only reason Rommel wanted to switch sides. The relationship seemed to go significantly downhill after a conversation in July 1943, in which Hitler told Rommel that if they did not win the war, the Germans could rot. Rommel even began to think that it was lucky that his Afrika Korps was now safe as POWs and could escape Hitler's Wagnerian ending. Die Welt comments that Hitler chose Rommel as his favourite because he was apolitical, and that the combination of his military expertise and circumstances allowed Rommel to remain clean.

Rommel's political inclinations were a controversial matter even among the contemporary Nazi elites. Rommel himself, while showing support to some facets of the Nazi ideology and enjoying the propaganda machine that the Nazis had built around him, was enraged by the Nazi media's effort to portray him as an early Party member and son of a mason, forcing them to correct this misinformation. The Nazi elites were not comfortable with the idea of a national icon who did not wholeheartedly support the regime. Hitler and Goebbels, his main supporters, tended to defend him. When Rommel was being considered for appointment as Commander-in-Chief of the Army in the summer of 1942, Goebbels wrote in his diary that Rommel "is ideologically sound, is not just sympathetic to the National Socialists. He is a National Socialist; he is a troop leader with a gift for improvisation, personally courageous and extraordinarily inventive. These are the kinds of soldiers we need." Despite this, they gradually saw that his grasp of political realities and his views could be very different from theirs. Hitler knew, though, that Rommel's optimistic and combative character was indispensable for his war efforts. When Rommel lost faith in the final victory and Hitler's leadership, Hitler and Goebbels tried to find an alternative in Manstein to remedy the fighting will and "political direction" of other generals but did not succeed.

Meanwhile, officials who did not like Rommel, such as Bormann and Schirach, whispered to each other that he was not a Nazi at all. Rommel's relationship to the Nazi elites, other than Hitler and Goebbels, was mostly hostile, although even powerful people like Bormann and Himmler had to tread carefully around Rommel. Himmler, who played a decisive role in Rommel's death, tried to blame Keitel and Jodl for the deed. And in fact the deed was initiated by them. They deeply resented Rommel's meteoric rise and had long feared that he would become the Commander-in-Chief. (Hitler also played innocent by trying to erect a monument for the national hero, on 7 March 1945) Franz Halder, after concocting several schemes to rein in Rommel through people like Paulus and Gause to no avail (even willing to undermine German operations and strategy in the process for the sole purpose of embarrassing him), concluded that Rommel was a madman with whom no one dared to cross swords because of "his brutal methods and his backing from the highest levels". (Rommel imposed a high number of courts martial, but according to Westphal, he never signed the final order. Owen Connelly comments that he could afford easy discipline because of his charisma). Rommel for his part was highly critical of Himmler, Halder, the High Command and particularly Goering who Rommel at one point called his "bitterest enemy". Hitler realised that Rommel attracted the elites' negative emotions to himself, in the same way he generated optimism in the common people. Depending on the case, Hitler manipulated or exacerbated the situation in order to benefit himself, although he originally had no intent of pushing Rommel to the point of destruction. (Even when informed of Rommel's involvement in the plot, hurt and vengeful, Hitler at first wanted to retire Rommel, and eventually offered him a last-minute chance to explain himself and refute the claims, which Rommel apparently did not take advantage of.) Ultimately Rommel's enemies worked together to bring him down.

Maurice Remy concludes that, unwillingly and probably without ever realising it, Rommel was part of a murderous regime, although he never actually grasped the core of Nazism. Peter Lieb sees Rommel as a person who could not be put into a single drawer, although problematic by modern moral standards, and suggests people should personally decide for themselves whether Rommel should remain a role model or not. He was a Nazi general in some aspects, considering his support for the leader cult (Führerkult) and the Volksgemeinschaft, but he was not an antisemite, nor a war criminal, nor a radical ideological fighter. Historian Cornelia Hecht remarks "It is really hard to know who the man behind the myth was," noting that in numerous letters he wrote to his wife during their almost 30-year marriage, he commented little on political issues as well as his personal life as a husband and a father.

 Rommel myth 

According to some revisionist authors, an assessment of Rommel's role in history has been hampered by views of Rommel that were formed, at least in part, for political reasons, creating what these historians have called the "Rommel myth". The interpretation considered by some historians to be a myth is the depiction of the Field Marshal as an apolitical, brilliant commander and a victim of Nazi Germany who participated in the 20 July plot against Adolf Hitler. There are a notable number of authors who refer to "Rommel Myth" or "Rommel Legend" in a neutral or positive manner though. The seeds of the myth can be found first in Rommel's drive for success as a young officer in World War I and then in his popular 1937 book Infantry Attacks, which was written in a style that diverged from the German military literature of the time and became a best-seller.

The myth then took shape during the opening years of World War II, as a component of Nazi propaganda to praise the Wehrmacht and instill optimism in the German public, with Rommel's willing participation. When Rommel came to North Africa, it was picked up and disseminated in the West by the British press as the Allies sought to explain their continued inability to defeat the Axis forces in North Africa. The British military and political figures contributed to the heroic image of the man as Rommel resumed offensive operations in January 1942 against the British forces weakened by redeployments to the Far East. During parliamentary debate following the fall of Tobruk, Churchill described Rommel as an "extraordinary bold and clever opponent" and a "great field commander".

According to Der Spiegel following the war's end, West Germany yearned for father figures who were needed to replace the former ones who had been unmasked as criminals. Rommel was chosen because he embodied the decent soldier, cunning yet fair-minded, and if guilty by association, not so guilty that he became unreliable, and additionally, former comrades reported that he was close to the Resistance. While everyone else was disgraced, his star became brighter than ever, and he made the historically unprecedented leap over the threshold between eras: from Hitler's favourite general to the young republic's hero. Cornelia Hecht notes that despite the change of times, Rommel has become the symbol of different regimes and concepts, which is paradoxical, whoever the man he really was.

At the same time, the Western Allies, and particularly the British, depicted Rommel as the "good German". His reputation for conducting a clean war was used in the interest of the West German rearmament and reconciliation between the former enemies—Britain and the United States on one side and the new Federal Republic of Germany on the other. When Rommel's alleged involvement in the plot to kill Hitler became known after the war, his stature was enhanced in the eyes of his former adversaries. Rommel was often cited in Western sources as a patriotic German willing to stand up to Hitler. Churchill wrote about him in 1950: "[Rommel] (...) deserves our respect because, although a loyal German soldier, he came to hate Hitler and all his works and took part in the conspiracy of 1944 to rescue Germany by displacing the maniac and tyrant."

 Family life 
While at Cadet School in 1911, Rommel met and became engaged to 17-year-old Lucia (Lucie) Maria Mollin (1894–1971). While stationed in Weingarten in 1913, Rommel developed a relationship with Walburga Stemmer, which produced a daughter, Gertrud, born 8 December 1913. Because of elitism in the officer corps, Stemmer's working-class background made her unsuitable as an officer's wife, and Rommel felt honour-bound to uphold his previous commitment to Mollin. With Mollin's cooperation, he accepted financial responsibility for the child. Rommel and Mollin were married in November 1916 in Danzig. Rommel's marriage was a happy one, and he wrote his wife at least one letter every day while he was in the field.

After the end of the First World War, the couple settled initially in Stuttgart, and Stemmer and her child lived with them. Gertrud was referred to as Rommel's niece, a fiction that went unquestioned because of the enormous number of women widowed during the war. Walburga died suddenly in October 1928, and Gertrud remained a member of the household until Rommel's death in 1944. The incident with Walburga seemed to affect Rommel for the rest of his life: he would always keep women distant. A son, Manfred Rommel, was born on 24 December 1928, later served as Mayor of Stuttgart from 1974 to 1996.

 Awards 
 Military Merit Order (Württemberg)
 Friedrich Order Knight 1st Class (Württemberg)
 Military Merit Cross, 3rd class with war decoration and swords (Austria-Hungary)
 Military Merit Order (Bavaria) 4th Class with Swords 
 Iron Cross 2nd Class on 24 September 1914 and 1st Class on 29 January 1915
 Pour le Mérite on 18 December 1917
 Wound Badge 1918 in Silver 
 Clasp to the Iron Cross 2nd Class on 13 May 1940 and 1st Class on 15 May 1940
 Panzer Badge In Silver
 Knight's Cross of the Iron Cross with Oak Leaves, Swords and Diamonds
 Knight's Cross of the Iron Cross on 27 May 1940 as commander of the 7th Panzer-Division
 Oak Leaves (10th recipient) on 20 March 1941 as commander of the 7th Panzer-Division
 Swords (sixth recipient) on 20 January 1942 as commander of the Panzer Group Afrika
 Diamonds (sixth recipient) on 11 March 1943 as commander in chief of the Army Group Afrika
 Grand Officer of the Military Order of Savoy on 11 May 1941
 Knight Grand Cross in summer 1942
 Italian Gold Medal of Military Valour in February 1942
 Knight of the Colonial Order of the Star of Italy in February 1942

 Commemoration 

The German Army's largest base, the Field Marshal Rommel Barracks, Augustdorf, is named in his honour; at the dedication in 1961 his widow Lucie and son Manfred Rommel were guests of honour. The Rommel Barracks, Dornstadt, was also named for him in 1965. A third base named for him, the Field Marshal Rommel Barracks, Osterode, closed in 2004. The  was named for him in 1969 and christened by his widow; the ship was decommissioned in 1998.

The Rommel Memorial was erected in Heidenheim in 1961. In 2020, a sculpture of a landmine victim was placed next to the Rommel Memorial in Heidenheim. The city mayor Bernhard Ilg comments that, regarding "the great son of Heidenheim", "there are many opinions". Heidenheim eventually dedicated the Memorial towards a stand against war, militarism and extremism, stating that when the memorial was erected in 1961, statements were added that now are not compatible with modern knowledge about Rommel. The Deutsche Welle notes that the 17 million mines the British, Italian, and German armies left continue to claim lives to this day.

In Aalen, after a discussion on renaming a street named after him, a new place of commemoration was created, where stelae with information on the lives of Rommel and three opponents of the regime (Eugen Bolz, Friedrich Schwarz and Karl Mikeller) stand together (Rommel's stele is dark blue and rusty red while the others are light-coloured). The History Association of Aalen, together with an independent commission of historians from Düsseldorf, welcomes the keeping of the street's name and notes that Rommel was neither war criminal nor resistance fighter, but perpetrator and victim at the same time - he willingly served as figurehead for the regime, then lately recognised his mistake and paid for that with his life. An education program named "Erwin Rommel and Aalen" for school children in Aalen is also established.

In 2021, the Student Council of the Friedrich-Alexander-University Erlangen-Nürnberg (FAU) decided to change the name of their Süd-Campus (South Campus, Erlangen) into Rommel-Campus, emphasising that the city of Erlangen stands behind the name and the university needs to do the same. The university's branch of the Education and Science Workers' Union (GEW) describes the decision as problematic considering Rommel's history of supporting the Nazi regime militarily and propagandistically.

Numerous streets in Germany, especially in Rommel's home state of Baden-Württemberg, are named in his honour, including the street near where his last home was located. The Rommel Museum opened in 1989 in the Villa Lindenhof in Herrlingen. The museum now operates under the name Museum Lebenslinien (Lifelines Museum), which presents the lives of Rommel and other notable residents of Herrlingen, including the poet Gertrud Kantorowicz (whose collection is presented together with the Rommel Archive inside a building on a road named after Rommel), the educators Anna Essinger and Hugo Rosenthal. There is also a Rommel Museum in Mersa Matruh in Egypt which opened in 1977, and which is located in one of Rommel's former headquarters; various other localities and establishments in Mersa Matruh, including Rommel Beach, are also named for Rommel. The reason for the naming is that he respected the Bedouins' traditions and the sanctity of their homes (he always kept his troops at least 2 kilometres from their houses) and refused to poison the wells against the Allies, fearing doing so would harm the population.

In Italy, the annual marathon tour "Rommel Trail", which is sponsored by the Protezione Civile and the autonomous region of Friuli Venezia Giulia through its tourism agency, celebrates Rommel and the Battle of Caporetto. The naming and sponsoring (at that time by the center-left PD) was criticised by the politician Giuseppe Civati in 2017.

 See also 
 Erwin Rommel and the Bundeswehr

ReferencesInformational notesCitationsBibliography 
 
 
 
 
 
 
 
 
 
 
 
 
 
 
 
 
 
 
 
 
 
 
 
 
 
 
 
 
 
 
 
 

 
 
 	
 
 
 
 
 
 
 
 
 
 
 
 
 
 
 
 
 
 
 
 

 
 
 
 
 
 
 
 
 
 
 
 

 
 
 
 
 
 

 
 
 
 
 
 
 
 
 
 Further reading'''

 
 
 
 
 
 
 
 
 
 
 
 
 Samuels, Martin (2017) "Erwin Rommel and German Military Doctrine, 1912–1940" War in History'' v.24 n.3 pp. 308–35

External links 
 
 Erwin Rommel. Biography.com
 
 
 "Defeating the Desert Fox": , via the official channel of The National WWII Museum; session by Nigel Hamilton at the 2012 International Conference on World War II
 
 

 
1891 births
1944 suicides
Burials in Baden-Württemberg
Forced suicides
German anti-communists
German Lutherans
German military writers
German Army personnel of World War I
German military personnel who committed suicide
Grand Officers of the Military Order of Savoy
Military personnel of Württemberg
Military personnel from Baden-Württemberg
Members of the 20 July plot who committed suicide
People from Heidenheim
People from the Kingdom of Württemberg
Recipients of the clasp to the Iron Cross, 1st class
Recipients of the Gold Medal of Military Valor
Recipients of the Order of Michael the Brave, 2nd class
Recipients of the Knight's Cross of the Iron Cross with Oak Leaves, Swords and Diamonds
Recipients of the Pour le Mérite (military class)
Suicides by cyanide poisoning
Suicides in Germany